= Dai Zhou =

Dai Zhou 戴冑
- Born: Unknown; Anyang, Henan
- Died: 633
- Other names: Xuanyin (玄胤); Duke Zhong of Dao (道忠公)
- Occupation: Statesman
- Children: one daughter

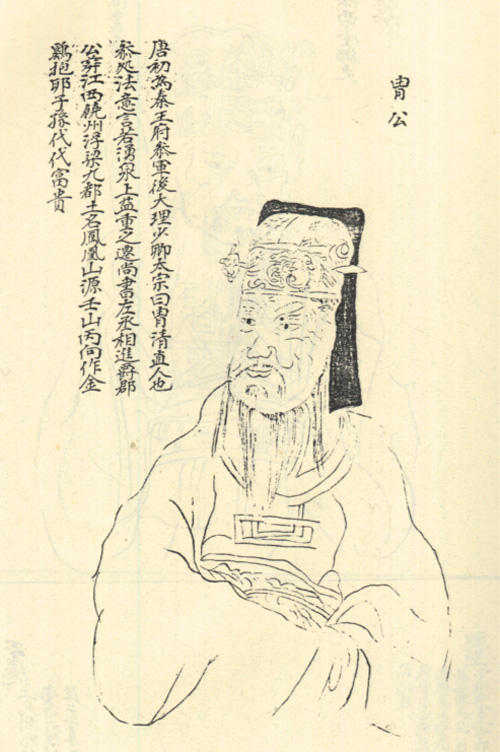
Portrait of Dai Zhou (from the Qing Dynasty edition of the Dai Clan Genealogy of Xiuning, Anhui)

Dai Zhou (died 633), courtesy name Xuanyin, posthumously known as Duke Zhong of Dao, was a Chinese official who lived in the Sui dynasty and early Tang dynasty. He served as a chancellor during the reign of Emperor Taizong of Tang.

== During Sui dynasty ==
It is not known when Dai Zhou was born, and little is known about his family background, other than that he was from Xiang Province (相州, roughly modern Handan, Hebei—although Dai appeared to be from the part of Xiang Province now part of Anyang, Henan). He was said to be honest and capable. He studied law in his youth and was an excellent record-keeper. Near the end of the reign of Emperor Yang of Sui, he served as a low-level official in the examination bureau of the government (門下省, Menxia Sheng), and he was honored by both Su Wei and Pei Ju, the head and the deputy head of the examination bureau. In 618, after Emperor Yang was killed in a coup at Jiangdu (江都, in modern Yangzhou, Jiangsu), the Sui officials at the eastern capital Luoyang declared Emperor Yang's grandson Yang Tong the Prince of Yue emperor. Dai was slightly promoted in Yang Tong's administration, but remained relatively low in his position.

== Service under Wang Shichong ==
Later in 618, the Sui general Wang Shichong, who opposed rapprochement with Li Mi, who had led a rebellion against Emperor Yang, killed the officials who were in favor of peace with Li, and seized power as regent. After he defeated Li and forced Li to flee to Tang dynasty territory, he began to have designs on the throne. Seeing this, Dai spoke to Wang:

The relationship between emperor and subject is like the relationship between father and son. There needs to be propriety so that it would have a good start and a good end. You, honored Duke, has both civil and martial abilities, and the empire depends on you. Whether it succeeds or falls depends on what you do. I hope that you are faithful to the imperial house, and you follow the examples of Yi Yin and the Duke of Zhou, so that the empire can be as secure as Mount Tai and your own lineage can pass on for generations in honor, then the people, all the way to the sea, will be glad.

Wang praised Dai's words publicly and rewarded him, but did not relent on the efforts to take over the throne. In 619, when Wang had Yang Tong bestow the nine bestowments on him—the penultimate step before seizing the throne—Dai spoke against it, but Wang did not accept Dai's suggestion. Rather, he made Dai the secretary general of Zheng Prefecture (鄭州, roughly modern Zhengzhou, Henan) to assist his nephew Wang Xingben (王行本) in defending Hulao Pass. He continued to serve in that role after Wang seized the throne later in 619, ending Sui and establishing a new state of Zheng as its emperor. In 621, the Tang general Li Shimin the Prince of Qin (a son of Tang's Emperor Gaozu), during the campaign against Zheng, captured Hulao, and Dai became captive. Li Shimin made Dai a military advisor on his staff.

== During Tang dynasty ==
Dai Zhou's activities for the next few years were not clear. In 626, Li Shimin, locked in an intense rivalry with his older brother Li Jiancheng the Crown Prince and fearing that Li Jiancheng would kill him, ambushed Li Jiancheng and another brother who supported Li Jiancheng, Li Yuanji the Prince of Qi, at Xuanwu Gate and killed them. He then effectively forced Emperor Gaozu to first create him crown prince and then yield the throne to him (as Emperor Taizong). Once he took the throne, he made Dai an assistant to the minister of defense, and he also created Dai the Baron of Wuchang.

In 627, Dai was made the deputy chief judge of the supreme court. At that time, there was an incident where Zhangsun Wuji, Emperor Taizong's brother-in-law and the minister of civil service affairs, forgot to take off his sword when entering the palace, a major violation of regulations. The chancellor Feng Deyi recommended that the guard who did not notice Zhangsun's entrance with the sword to be executed, while Zhangsun be fined a large amount of copper. Emperor Taizong agreed to Feng's proposed punishment. Dai rejected it, however, stating that according to the law, both the guard and Zhangsun should be put to death. Emperor Taizong sent the suggestion back to the high level officials for rediscussion, and Feng again proposed the same punishments—execution for the guard and a fine for Zhangsun. Dai then spoke again, arguing that it was unfair for the guard to be executed and Zhangsun to be only fined. Emperor Taizong agreed and spared the guard.

At that time, the imperial administration was selecting many officials to fill its posts, and there were many officials who received positions after lying about their lineages or past experiences. Emperor Taizong issued an edict ordering the officials to admit to their falsehoods, promising to spare them if they did so before a deadline, but stating that they would be executed if their falsehoods were discovered after the deadline. When some officials were indeed discovered after the deadline to have falsified their lineages or past experiences, Emperor Taizong ordered that they be executed, but Dai rejected the order and instead sentenced them to exile. Emperor Taizong stated, "I issued an edict that those who did not admit would be executed, but you, lord, sentenced them only to exile. This made my words not stand up to the people. Are you betraying justice, lord?" Dai responded, "If Your Imperial Majesty had killed them on the spot, there would be nothing I could do. Now that you have sent them to the supreme court, I have to follow the law." Emperor Taizong stated, "You, lord, are following the law, but you are making me lose credibility." Dai responded, "The law is how the empire can keep its credibility. Your Imperial Majesty made your words based on your feelings at that time, and you declared executions based on your anger. By repudiating your action and putting them in the hands of the law, you are showing that you can hold back your anger and respect the state's credibility. I would feel pity if Your Imperial Majesty followed your anger and not your credibility." Emperor Taizong was pleased and responded, "I now know that if there is a problem with the law, you, Duke, will correct it. I do not worry any more." It was said that Dai often spoke against Emperor Taizong's wishes in this way, and that as a result, people were not falsely convicted or punished while he was serving.

Later in 627, Dai was made a deputy head of the important executive bureau of government (尚書省, Shangshu Sheng). At that time, where there were famines, the Tang local governments would first distribute from the local food storages to the people, but after the local storages ran out, they would send the people to other prefectures for food, and the system was insufficient to stop people from starving. Dai proposed that Emperor Taizong follow the example of Emperor Wen of Sui and establish large food storages to prepare for famines, and that both the nobles and the regular populace be made to submit a regular tax in either wheat or rice so that the food storages can be filled. Emperor Taizong agreed, and in recognition of this suggestion, because Dai was not wealthy, he awarded Dai with money.

Around that time, the positions of the heads of the executive bureau happened to be both vacant—as Xiao Yu had just been removed from office, and Feng had just died. Emperor Taizong had Dai temporarily take over their responsibilities, and it was said that Dai carried out appropriate and rapid decisions. Emperor Taizong also had Dai and Wei Zheng rotate in submitting suggestions to him.

In 629, Dai became the minister of census, as well as an advisor to Emperor Taizong's son and crown prince Li Chengqian. In 630, while the chancellor Du Ruhui was on his deathbed, he submitted a suggestion to Emperor Taizong that Dai be put in charge of civil service affairs, and Emperor Taizong therefore had Dai, in addition to his other responsibilities, also become the minister of civil service affairs—and also gave Dai the additional designation of Canyu Chaozheng (參豫朝政), making him a de facto chancellor. It was said that Dai was capable, but as he was not learned, he selected largely people who are capable in the law and not in writing, and was criticized by others at the time for this. Later in the year, he was no longer the minister of civil service affairs, but he kept his other posts and continued to be designated de facto chancellor. He was also created a duke.

Also in 631, Emperor Taizong was set to build palaces at Luoyang. Dai spoke against it, reasoning that the people were too worn out by the wars to be ready for large construction projects. Emperor Taizong praised and rewarded him, stating, "Dai Zhou is not a relative to me, but he is faithful and capable. He is also considerate of the state, and where there is something important, he did not hesitate to let me know. The offices and titles he received are but tokens of my thanks to him."

Dai died in 633. Emperor Taizong posthumously created him the greater title of Duke of Dao. He commissioned the official Yu Shinan to author the text of a stone monument to Dai, and as Dai's residence was small and had no room for a temple to be dedicated to Dai, he had the construction officials build a temple for Dai. It was said that both Wei Zheng and Fang Xuanling were impressed with Dai and was therefore endeared to him, and that after his death, when both visited places where they had previously visited with Dai, they would shed tears. As Dai had no sons, his nephew Dai Zhide inherited his title.

== Notes and references ==
- Old Book of Tang, vol. 70.
- New Book of Tang, vol. 99.
- Zizhi Tongjian, vols. 187, 192, 193.
