= Du Yan =

Chancellor of the Tang dynasty

Du Yan 杜淹
- Born: Unknown; Xi'an, Shaanxi
- Died: 8 November 628
- Other names: Zhili (執禮); Duke Xiang of Anji (安吉襄公)
- Occupation: Statesman
- Children: Du Jingtong
- Father: Du Hui
- Relatives: Du Ruhui (nephew)

Du Yan (died 8 November 628), courtesy name Zhili, posthumously known as Duke Xiang of Anji, was a Chinese official who served as a chancellor during the reign of Emperor Taizong in the Tang dynasty. His more famous nephew, Du Ruhui, was also a chancellor.

== During the Sui dynasty ==
It is not known when Du Yan was born, but it is known that he was from the Sui dynasty's capital commandery Jingzhao (京兆, i.e., Chang'an). His grandfather Du Ye (杜業) was a provincial governor for Sui's predecessor state Northern Zhou, and his father Du Zheng (杜徵) was a commandery governor for Northern Zhou. In his youth, Du Yan had a good reputation for being talented in rhetoric, and he and a friend from the same commandery, Wei Fusi (韋福嗣), conversed between themselves and concluded that Emperor Wen of Sui favored people who had been hermits. They therefore went into Mount Taibai (太白山, part of the Qinling Mountains), to try to gain reputations as hermits in order to benefit themselves later on in their careers. When Emperor Wen heard this, however, he became angry at them, and he exiled them to the south of the Yangtze River.

Later, probably after a general pardon, Du Yan was able to return to Chang'an. Gao Xiaoji (高孝基), an official of the capital province Yong Province (雍州) submitted a recommendation for him, and he was made a low level imperial official. By the end of the reign of Emperor Wen's son Emperor Yang, he was the deputy imperial censor.

== Service under Wang Shichong ==
In 619, with the Sui state collapsing in light of rebellions around the empire before and after Emperor Yang's death in a coup in 618, the general Wang Shichong, in control of the eastern capital Luoyang, deposed the last Sui emperor, Emperor Yang's grandson Yang Tong and declared himself emperor of a new state of Zheng. Wang made Du Yan the minister of civil service affairs and trusted him greatly. Meanwhile, Du Yan's nephew Du Ruhui had become an important advisor to Li Shimin, a son of the rival Tang dynasty's Emperor Gaozu and a major Tang general. Du Ruhui's older brother (whose name is lost to history) and younger brother Du Chuke (杜楚客) were at Luoyang at that time, under Zheng rule. Du Yan had poor relations with his nephews, and he decided to act against them. He falsely accused them before Wang, and Wang executed Du Ruhui's older brother and imprisoned Du Chuke. Du Chuke almost starved to death but survived the imprisonment.

In 621, Li Shimin put Luoyang under siege and, after defeating Wang's ally Dou Jiande the Prince of Xia, forced Wang to surrender. Li Shimin spared Wang, but executed a number of his high-level officials. Du Yan was initially set to be executed. Du Chuke asked Du Ruhui to intercede on Du Yan's behalf, and Du Ruhui initially refused. Du Chuke, however, pointed out that while Du Yan was responsible for their older brother's death, he was an uncle. Du Ruhui relented and pleaded with Li Shimin on Du Yan's behalf, and Du Yan was spared.

== During Emperor Gaozu's reign ==
Du Yan apparently became a minor official in the imperial administration, but was not promoted. Eventually, he considered resigning and joining the staff of Li Shimin's older brother Li Jiancheng the Crown Prince—with whom Li Shimin was then having an intense rivalry. The official in charge of civil service affairs at that time, Feng Deyi, informed Li Shimin's chief strategist Fang Xuanling of this, and Fang, knowing that Du was intelligent and full of strategies, feared that Du, if he joined Li Jiancheng's staff, would cause detriment to Li Shimin, and therefore persuaded Li Shimin to invite Du to join his staff. Du accepted the invitation.

In 624, there was an incident where Li Jiancheng was discovered to have, against regulations, recruited additional soldiers for his guard corps. Emperor Gaozu was angry and put Li Jiancheng under house arrest for a time. He also considered creating Li Shimin crown prince instead to replace Li Jiancheng. Li Jiancheng's guard commander, Yang Wen'gan (楊文幹), in fear, rose in rebellion. Li Shimin and the other generals quickly defeated and killed Yang. However, with the intercession of another son -- Li Yuanji the Prince of Qi, Feng, and his concubines (who were on much better relations with Li Jiancheng and Li Yuanji than with Li Shimin), Emperor Gaozu changed his mind and did not depose Li Jiancheng. Instead, he blamed Li Jiancheng's staff member Wang Gui and two of Li Shimin's staff members—Du and Wei Ting (韋挺) -- of inciting the brothers to struggle against each other. He exiled Wang, Du, and Wei to Xi Prefecture (巂州, roughly modern Liangshan Yi Autonomous Prefecture, Sichuan). Before Du departed, Li Shimin, believing that Du was unfairly blamed, gave him a substantial gift of gold.

== During Emperor Taizong's reign ==
In 626, Li Shimin ambushed Li Jiancheng and Li Yuanji at Xuanwu Gate and killed them. He then effectively forced Emperor Gaozu to first create him crown prince and then yield the throne to him (as Emperor Taizong). Emperor Taizong recalled Du Yan from exile, made him the imperial censor, and created him the Duke of Anji. Emperor Taizong made Du in charge of the creation ceremony for his son and crown prince Li Chengqian, and in 627 made him the minister of civil service affairs. He also bestowed Du with the additional designation of Canyu Chaozheng (參豫朝政) -- a de facto chancellor designation. It was said that in these capacities, Du recommended more than 40 people to be imperial officials, and many of them were later known for good service.

There was a famous exchange between Emperor Taizong and Du involving Du's recommendation of a minor imperial official, Di Daohuai (邸道懷). As the Old Book of Tang recorded, this was the conversation:

Emperor Taizong asked Du, "How are Di's abilities?" Du responded, "During Sui days, Di served as an assistant official at the ministry of civil service affairs, and he was known for his integrity. When Emperor Yang was going to visit Jiangdu [(江都, in modern Yangzhou, Jiangsu), where Emperor Yang eventually died] and made up his mind, the high-level officials were all obedient to Emperor Yang, but Di, despite his low position, was insistent against it. I personally saw that myself. Emperor Taizong asked, "What did you advise Emperor Yang?" Du responded, "I told him to go." Emperor Taizong said, "Part of your responsibility in serving the emperor was to be honest without hiding anything. You praise Di, so why did you not make the same insistent advice?" Du responded, "At that time, I was not in an important post. I also knew that such advice would not be accepted, and it would not be of benefit for me to die." Emperor Taizong responded, "Confucius said that a son who always obeyed his father was not actually a filially pious son. Therefore a father needs to have a son who would give adverse advice, and a state needs to have officials who would give adverse advice. If you believe that Emperor Yang was a tyrant, why continue to serve him? If you accepted his salary, you had the responsibility to give good advice to him." ... He then smiled and said to Du, "When you, Lord, were serving under Sui, you were at a low post and maybe you had justification not to speak up. You were highly honored in Wang Shichong's administration. Why did you not speak up then?" Du responded, "I did. It was just that he did not listen to me." Emperor Taizong responded, "If Wang was virtuous and did what was good, then he would not have been destroyed. If he was a tyrant and resisted adverse advice, how could you have avoided disaster?" Du could not respond. Emperor Taizong then said, "Now you are highly honored. Are you willing to speak up?" Du responded, "I am willing to die. Further, when Baili Xi was at Yu, Yu was destroyed, but when he was at Qin, Qin became a major power. That is whom I secretly compare myself to." Emperor Taizong laughed.

At that time, Du was in multiple posts, but was not known for being honest. He was also discordant with Zhangsun Wuji, and his reputation suffered. When he later became ill, Emperor Taizong personally visited him and bestowed a gift of silk on him. He died in November 628.

== Notes and references ==
- Old Book of Tang, vol. 66.
- New Book of Tang, vol. 96.
- Zizhi Tongjian, vols. 187, 191, 192, 193.
