= Gao Shilian =

Chinese politician (576-647)

Gao Shilian 高士廉
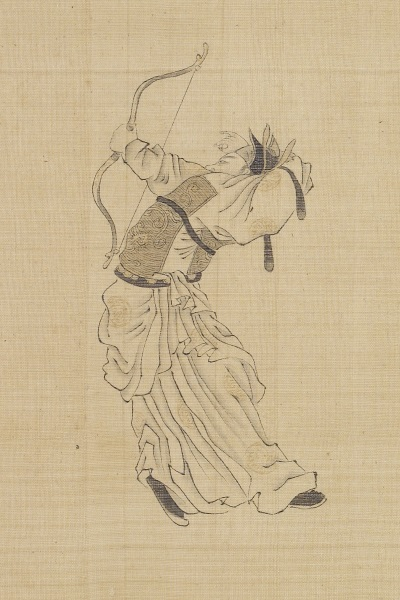
- Born: 576; Jing County, Hebei, Northern Qi dynasty
- Died: February 14, 647 (aged 70–71); Tang dynasty
- Other names: Gao Jian (高儉; given name); Duke Wenxian of Shen (申文獻公; posthumous name)
- Occupation: Politician
- Spouse: Lady Xianyu
- Children: Gao Lüxing; Gao Zhixing; Gao Chunxing; Gao Zhenxing; Gao Shěnxing; Gao Shènxing
- Father: Gao Mai
- Relatives: Empress Zhangsun (niece)

Gao Jian (576 – February 14, 647), courtesy name Shilian, better known as Gao Shilian, posthumous name Duke Wenxian of Shen (Chinese: 申文獻公), was a Chinese politician of the Tang dynasty. He was the uncle of Empress Zhangsun, Emperor Taizong's wife, and a trusted advisor to Emperor Taizong.

== Background ==
Gao Shilian was born in 576, in the waning years of Northern Qi, as a member of Northern Qi's imperial Gao clan. His grandfather Gao Yue (高岳) the Prince of Qinghe was a cousin of Gao Huan, the paramount general of Northern Wei and its branch successor state Eastern Wei and the father of three of Northern Qi's emperors; Gao Yue was an important official for Northern Qi until he was forced by Emperor Wenxuan to commit suicide in 555. His father Gao Mai (高勱) initially inherited the title of Prince of Qinghe, and later had his title changed to Prince of Le'an. He served as an important official under several emperors. When Northern Zhou forces launched a major attack on Northern Qi in 576 and approached the capital Yecheng in spring 577, Gao Mai advocated resisting to the last man, but the emperor Gao Wei could not accept his suggestion and fled instead. After Gao Wei was captured by Northern Zhou forces and Northern Zhou took over Northern Qi territory, Gao Mai was made a minor official with little power. (Contrary to the fate of most Northern Qi princes, who were slaughtered by Emperor Wu of Northern Zhou late in 577, Gao Mai was not killed.) After Northern Zhou itself was overthrown by the Sui dynasty in 581, Gao Mai was made a provincial governor.

== During the Sui dynasty and Xiao Xi's restoration of the Liang dynasty ==
Gao Shilian was known for proper conduct in his youth, and he was studied in literature and history. He became a friend of the important officials Xue Daoheng (薛道衡) and Cui Zujun (崔祖濬), although he was much younger than they were. During the reign of Emperor Wen of Sui, Gao became a junior official at the ministry of ceremonies. Meanwhile, his younger sister married the general Zhangsun Sheng (長孫晟), but after Zhangsun Sheng died in 609, Zhangsun Sheng's son, by a prior wife, Zhangsun Anye (長孫安業), expelled her and her two children—a son named Zhangsun Wuji and a daughter—from the Zhangsun household. She took her children to Gao Shilian's household, and Gao Shilian took them in and raised the children. In 613, it was by his decision that young Lady Zhangsun, then 12, married Li Shimin, the 14-year-old son of the general Li Yuan the Duke of Tang, as he was impressed by Li Shimin.

In 614, during the second campaign against Goguryeo by Emperor Wen's son Emperor Yang, the general Yang Xuangan rebelled, and one of Yang Xuangan's associates, the minister of defense Husi Zheng (斛斯政), fled to Goguryeo. As Gao was friendly with Husi, he was demoted and exiled to being the secretary general of Zhuyuan County (朱鳶, in modern northern Vietnam). As he did not want to subject his parents to the distant travel into the remote region, he left his wife Lady Xianyu to stay with his parents and went by himself. Further, in order to allow his sister to continue be able to live without him around, he sold his mansion and bought a smaller house, and then divided the remaining proceeds with his sister before departing for Zhuyuan.

In 617, with almost the entire Sui territory engulfed in agrarian rebellions against Emperor Yang's rule, Xiao Xi, a descendant of the Liang dynasty's imperial line, rose as well, declaring a restoration of Liang, and soon seized the modern Hubei and Hunan region and was seeking to expand. In spring 618, Xiao sent his general Ning Changzhen (寧長真) south. At that time, Gao had become the legal assistant to Qiu He (丘和) the governor of Jiaozhi Commandery (交趾, modern northern Vietnam). Qiu had previously rejected overtures by both Xiao and another rebel ruler, Lin Shihong the Emperor of Chu, but in light of Ning's attack was considering submitting to Xiao. Gao advised against it, arguing that Ning's forces had marched a long distance and would be fatigued, and Qiu agreed, engaging and defeating Ning. However, when news came that Emperor Yang had been killed in a coup at Jiangdu (江都, in modern Yangzhou, Jiangsu) led by the general Yuwen Huaji, Qiu submitted to Xiao.

== During Emperor Gaozu's reign ==
Li Yuan, who established the Tang dynasty at Chang'an in 618, sent his nephew Li Xiaogong the Prince of Zhao Commandery and Li Jing to attack Liang in 621. Li Xiaogong and Li Jing were successful in capturing Xiao Xi's capital Jiangling (江陵, in modern Jingzhou, Hubei) and forcing him to surrender. Thereafter, most of Liang territory submitted to Tang, and in spring 622, Qiu He sent Gao Shilian to Chang'an to show submission to Tang; Emperor Gaozu in turn sent Qiu He's sons Qiu Shili (丘師利) to Jiaozhi to accept his submission. Li Shimin, who was then the Prince of Qin and a major general under his father, retained Gao to serve on his staff as part of the government for the capital prefecture Yong Prefecture (雍州), of which he was prefect. As Gao was Princess Zhangsun's uncle, Li Shimin respected and trusted him.

By 626, Li Shimin was locked in an intense rivalry with his older brother Li Jiancheng the Crown Prince, and he feared that Li Jiancheng would kill him. Gao and his nephew Zhangsun Wuji both suggested Li Shimin to act first, and Li Shimin agreed. In summer 626, he laid an ambush for Li Jiancheng and another brother who supported Li Jiancheng, Li Yuanji the Prince of Qi, killing them at Xuanwu Gate. Gao participated in leading part of Li Shimin's personal guards against the guards of Li Jiancheng and Li Yuanji in the aftermaths. After Li Shimin's victory, he effectively forced Emperor Gaozu to create him crown prince. Gao was made an honored advisor to Li Shimin, and soon was made the Shizhong (侍中)—the head of the examination bureau of the government (門下省; Menxia Sheng) and a post considered one for a chancellor. Two months later, Emperor Gaozu yielded the throne to Li Shimin (as Emperor Taizong).

== During Emperor Taizong's reign ==
Later in 626, when Eastern Tujue's Jiali Khan Ashina Duobi launched a major incursion into Tang territory, reaching all the way to Chang'an, Gao Shilian, along with Fang Xuanling, attended to Emperor Taizong as he personally met Ashina Duobi to promise additional tributes, to induce Ashina Duobi to withdraw. In 627, Emperor Taizong created Gao the Duke of Yixing.

Later in 627, there was an incident in which Gao Shilian's deputy, Wang Gui, had written a secret petition to Emperor Taizong and, per protocol, submitted it first to Gao and requested that Gao attach it to his own submission to Emperor Taizong. Gao, however, held onto Wang's petition and did not submit it, and also did not inform Wang that he did so. When Emperor Taizong found out about this, he demoted Gao to the post of commandant at An Prefecture (安州, roughly modern Xiaogan, Hubei). Gao was later made the secretary general of Yi Prefecture (益州, roughly modern Chengdu, Sichuan), and as the titular commandant at Yi Prefecture was Emperor Taizong's young son Li Ke the Prince of Shu, Gao was effectively commandant. It was said that while serving at Yi Prefecture, Gao disabused the people of superstitions that led them not to attend to their parents when their parents were ill, improved irrigation, and encouraged learning.

In 631, Gao was recalled to the capital to serve as the minister of civil service affairs, and was created the greater title of Duke of Xu. One of his sons was also created a lesser duke. When Emperor Gaozu died in 635, Gao was in charge of building Emperor Gaozu's tomb, and was rewarded after the projet was completed.

In 637, as part of Emperor Taizong's scheme to bestow prefectures on his relatives and great generals and officials as their permanent domains, Gao's title was changed to Duke of Shen, and he was given the post of a prefectural prefect for his heirs to inherit. Soon, however, with many objections to the system, the strongest of which came from Zhangsun Wuji, Emperor Taizong cancelled the scheme, although Gao's title remained Duke of Shen.

Sometime before 638, Emperor Taizong, disgusted with the traditional noble clans of Cui, Lu, Li, and Zheng and believing that they were abusing their highly honored names, commissioned Gao, Wei Ting (韋挺), Linghu Defen, and Cen Wenben to compile a work later to be known as the Records of Clans (氏族志), with the intent of dividing the clans into nine classes based on their past contributions, good deeds, and ill deeds. In an initial draft that Gao submitted, he nevertheless ranked the branch of the Cui clan that the official Cui Min'gan (崔民幹) belonged to as the highest, a decision that Emperor Taizong rebuked, as he pointed out that Gao was merely again looking at tradition and not the recent contributions. He therefore personally intervened in revising the work, reducing Cui's clan to the third class. However, after the work was completed in 638, Emperor Taizong nevertheless rewarded Gao for compiling the work. In fall 638, he made Gao Pushe (僕射), a head of the important executive bureau of the government and also a post for a chancellor. In 641, when Emperor Taizong visited the eastern capital Luoyang, he left his crown prince Li Chengqian in charge of Chang'an, but had Gao serve as his assistant and effectively in charge. Later in 641, Gao and Fang drew rebuke from Emperor Taizong when they inquired of the deputy imperial architect, Dou Desu (竇德素) of imperial construction projects — which Emperor Taizong saw as an encroachment on his liberty. However, Wei pointed out that chancellors were supposed to be responsible for all affairs of state, and Emperor Taizong, realizing that he had erred, was humbled.

In 643, when Emperor Taizong commissioned the Portraits at Lingyan Pavilion to commemorate the 24 great contributors to Tang rule, Gao's portrait was one commissioned. Later in 643, Gao requested to retire from the post of Pushe. Emperor Taizong agreed, but had him continue to serve as a chancellor de facto, and also commissioned him and Wei Zheng to lead a project to compile notable literary works into a 1,200-volume compendium known as the Wensi Boyao (文思博要).

In 644, when Emperor Taizong, at an imperial gathering, stated to his key officials their strengths and weaknesses, he spoke, with regard to Gao:

Gao Shilian is well studied in both historical and current matters and has a clean heart. Even great disasters could not get him to lose his integrity. He never engaged in factionalism while in government. However, he had no fortitude to criticize and suggest to his superiors.

In 645, when Emperor Taizong attacked Goguryeo and left his crown prince Li Zhi (who replaced Li Chengqian in 643 after Li Chengqian was discovered to have plotted to overthrow Emperor Taizong) in charge of logistics at Ding Prefecture (定州, roughly modern Baoding, Hebei), Gao was left there as well to assist Li Zh, along with Liu Ji, Ma Zhou, Zhang Xingcheng, and Gao Jifu. When Li Zhi heard and decided important matters, he set up a seat for Gao next to him, but Gao declined the honor.

In spring 647, Gao was gravely ill. Emperor Taizong personally went to visit him. The next day, Gao died, and Emperor Taizong wanted to personally attend his wake, despite urgings by Fang not to, as Emperor Taizong was also himself recently ill. However, before Emperor Taizong could get to Gao's mansion, Zhangsun Wuji intercepted him and earnestly sought to stop him, lying down in the street before him to stop him. Emperor Taizong instead went up on the city walls to watch Gao's funeral procession in order to mourn. Gao was buried near the tomb of Empress Zhangsun (who died in 636), where Emperor Taizong would eventually be buried as well. By Gao's own will, no treasures were buried with him, only one set of clothes and some of Gao's own favorite books. Later, when Li Zhi became emperor after Emperor Taizong's death in 649 (as Emperor Gaozong), he ordered that Gao, along with Fang and Qutu Tong (屈突通), be worshipped at the same temple as Emperor Taizong.

== Notes and references ==
- Old Book of Tang, vol. 65.
- New Book of Tang, vol. 95.
- Zizhi Tongjian, vols. 185, 189, 190, 191, 192, 195, 196, 197, 198.
