= Wen Yanbo =

Wen Yanbo may refer to:

- Wen Yanbo (Tang dynasty) (575–637), Tang dynasty grand councilor
- Wen Yanbo (Song dynasty) (1006–1097), Song dynasty grand councilor
