= Chengxin =

Tang dynasty court musician (620s–639)

Chengxin (Chinese: 称心; pinyin: Chènxīn)(c. 620s – late 639; lit. "satisfying (my) heart") was a court musician in the early Tang dynasty and a catamite of Crown Prince Li Chengqian.

== Biography ==
According to both the Old Book of Tang and the New Book of Tang, as well as the Zizhi Tongjian, Chengxin was in his early teens, noted for his beauty and skill in singing and dancing, and was deeply favored by the crown prince Li Chengqian. Several Daoist priests—Qin Ying (秦英), Wei Lingfu (韦灵符), and Zhu Linggan (朱灵感)—also gained the prince’s intimacy through alleged use of “sorcery.” When Emperor Taizong learned of this, he was enraged and ordered Chengxin, Qin Ying, Wei Lingfu, and others executed; several more were implicated and beheaded. The prince, believing that the accusations had been instigated by his rival Li Tai, the Prince of Wei, was grief-stricken over Chengxin’s death. In the Eastern Palace, the prince's residence, he built a small house to enshrine a statue of Chengxin, made offerings every morning and evening, had a tomb and stele erected in his honor, posthumously awarded Chengxin an official rank, and would linger there weeping. For months he refused to appear at court, further straining his relationship with his father.

Buddhist sources such as the Xu Gaoseng Zhuan attribute Chengxin’s death to his association with Qin Ying, who was embroiled in a dispute with the monk Falin; these accounts provide more detail than the official histories, which do not record his birth or the exact circumstances of his execution. According to these sources, Qin Ying’s execution—along with those of several associates including Chengxin—took place in the winter of the 13th year of the Zhenguan era (639). From this, and the statement that he was in his teens at the time, Chengxin’s birth can be inferred to have been in the 620s.
