= Dai Zhide =

Dai Zhide (戴至德) (died March 16, 679), formally Duke Gong of Dao (道恭公), was an official of the Chinese Tang dynasty, serving as chancellor during the reign of Emperor Gaozong.

== Background ==
It is not known when Dai Zhide was born. His uncle Dai Zhou served as a chancellor during the reign of Emperor Taizong but was sonless, and so adopted Dai Zhide as his son. After Dai Zhou's death in 633, Dai Zhide, therefore, inherited the title of Duke of Dao, a title that Emperor Taizong posthumously created for Dai Zhou.

== Service under Emperor Gaozong ==
Not much is known about much of Dai Zhide's career as an imperial official, although it was known that he was serving as an assistant to Li Hong, the son and crown prince of Emperor Taizong's son and successor Emperor Gaozong in 671, when Emperor Gaozong and his wife Empress Wu (later known as Wu Zetian) left the capital Chang'an and took up residence at the eastern capital Luoyang, rarely returning to Chang'an thereafter. Emperor Gaozong left Li Hong in charge of Chang'an, but because Li Hong was often ill, it was said that the major decisions were largely made by Dai and his colleagues Zhang Wenguan and Xiao Dezhao (蕭德昭).

As of 667, Dai was serving as Xi Tai Shilang (西臺侍郎), the deputy head of the examination bureau of government (西臺, Xi Tai), when he was given the additional designation of Tong Dong Xi Tai Sanpin (同東西臺三品), making him a chancellor de facto. In 672, he became the minister of census and continued to serve as chancellor de facto.

In 675, Dai became Puye, a co-head of the important examination bureau of government (尚書省, Shangshu Sheng), serving with the famed general Liu Rengui. It was said that they rotated listening to the people's petitions on every other day, and that Liu, who often would give the petitioners encouraging words, quickly gained a good reputation among them, while Dai was more careful with his words with them but often advocated for them before the emperor. Nevertheless, because of Liu's words, the common people came to believe that he was capable and Dai was not, and on one occasion, it was recorded that an old lady submitted a petition to Dai, believing that he was Liu, and once she realized her mistake, she yelled at Dai, "I thought I am giving my petition to the Puye who can do things, but instead I am giving it to the useless Puye. Give me back my petition!" Dai laughed and gave her petition back to her. When asked about this, Dai said, "Awards and punishments are within the authority of our sovereign. Given that we are subjects, how can we fight for this authority with him?" When Emperor Gaozong heard this, he greatly approved of Dai. Dai died in 679, and Emperor Gaozong sent the imperial officials to his house to mourn him.

== Notes and references ==
- Old Book of Tang, vol. 70.
- New Book of Tang, vol. 99.
- Zizhi Tongjian, vols. 201, 202.
