= Li Tai =

Chinese prince (620–653)

Prince of Wei
- Born: 620
- Died: 14 January 653 (aged 33)
- Spouse: Yan Wan
- Issue: Li Xin, Prince of Pu; Li Hui, Prince of Xinping
Posthumous name
- Prince Gong of Pu (濮恭王)
- Father: Emperor Taizong of Tang
- Mother: Empress Zhangsun

Li Tai (Chinese: 李泰; pinyin: Lǐ Tài; 620 – 14 January 653 (Note: The Zizhi Tongjian recorded that Li Tai died on the guisi day after the 11th month (i.e. the 12th month, during the winter) of the 3rd year of the Yonghui era of Tang Gaozong's reign. This date corresponds to 14 Jan 653 on the Gregorian calendar. His biographies in volume 76 of Old Book of Tang and volume 80 of New Book of Tang recorded that he was 35 (by East Asian reckoning) when he died.)), courtesy name Huibao (惠褒), childhood nickname Qingque (青雀), posthumous name Prince Gong of Pu (濮恭王), was an imperial prince of the Chinese Tang dynasty.

Li Tai, who carried the noble title of Prince of Wei (魏王), was favored by his father, Emperor Taizong, for his literary talent and studiousness. His older brother Li Chengqian was crown prince, but Li Tai and his associates had design on that position, eventually pushing Li Chengqian to plot treason in 643. After Li Chengqian's plot was discovered, Li Chengqian was deposed, and Emperor Taizong agreed to create Li Tai the new crown prince. However, Emperor Taizong soon saw that Li Tai had pushed Li Chengqian toward rebellion by machination and further appeared to bear ill intentions toward their younger brother Li Zhi the Prince of Jin, and so Emperor Taizong named Li Zhi crown prince instead. Li Tai was reduced in rank and briefly put under house arrest, and then exiled. He died in exile in 653.

The Buddhist statues in the Main Wall of Bingyang South Cave of the Longmen Caves was dedicated by Li Tai to his deceased mother Empress Zhangsun.

== Early life ==
Li Tai was the fourth son of Li Shimin, then the Prince of Qin under his father Emperor Gaozu of Tang. His mother was Li Shimin's wife Princess Zhangsun, who had given birth to his older brother Li Chengqian previously and would have one other son later (Li Zhi) and three daughters. (Note: the future Princesses Changle, Jinyang, and Xincheng) In 620, he was created the Prince of Yidu, at the same time that Li Chengqian and another older brother, Li Ke (by Li Shimin's concubine Consort Yang (a daughter of Emperor Yang of Sui)) were also created princes. In 621, he was created the Prince of Wei (衛, different than his later title of 魏) and posthumously adopted into the line of his uncle Li Xuanba (李玄霸), who had died early without issue.

In 626, Li Shimin, in an intense rivalry with his older brother Li Jiancheng the Crown Prince, ambushed Li Jiancheng and another brother who supported Li Jiancheng, Li Yuanji the Prince of Qi, at Xuanwu Gate and killed them. He then effectively forced Emperor Gaozu to first create him crown prince and then yield the throne to him (as Emperor Taizong). He created Li Tai's mother Princess Zhangsun empress and Li Tai's older brother Li Chengqian crown prince. In 628, Li Tai's title was changed to Prince of Yue, (Note: Taizong made another royal member Li Baoding (李保定) heir to Li Xuanba instead of him.) and he was made the commandant at Yang Prefecture (揚州, roughly modern Yangzhou, Jiangsu), but was not sent to Yang Prefecture, remaining at the capital Chang'an instead. In 633, he was made the commandant at Fu Prefecture (鄜州, roughly modern Yan'an, Shaanxi), but also appeared to not have been sent there, and in 634 he became the prefect of the capital prefecture Yong Prefecture (雍州).

== As Prince of Wei ==
In 636, Li Tai's title was changed to Prince of Wei (魏), and he was made the commandant at Xiang Prefecture (相州, roughly modern Handan, Hebei), but again, he was not sent there, but remained at Chang'an. By this point, Emperor Taizong had begun to favor Li Tai greatly for his literary talent, he permitted Li Tai to retain a staff of scholars, (Note: In his annotations to Zizhi Tongjian, Hu Sanxing opinioned that with such a move, Emperor Taizong was essentially paving the way for Tai to vie with Chengqian for the position of taizi.) and also, because Li Tai was obese, allowed him to ride a litter into the palace rather than walk. When rumors reached him that the high-level officials dishonored Li Tai, he grew angry at them, but relented after the chancellor Wei Zheng pointed out that, in fact, according to Confucian ceremonies, those high-level officials were in fact supposed to be higher in rank than Li Tai. In 637, Emperor Taizong made the senior official Wang Gui, a one-time chancellor, Li Tai's teacher, and he ordered Li Tai to honor Wang as if he were honoring his own father. Li Tai did so, and Wang accepted this. In 640, Emperor Taizong personally visited Li Tai's mansion, and to celebrate the occasion, Emperor Taizong pardoned the minor criminals of Chang'an, exempted Li Tai's neighborhood of its taxes for one year, and gave awards to Li Tai's staff members and the seniors in Li Tai's neighborhood.

Meanwhile, Li Tai's staff member Su Xu (蘇勖) suggested to him that, like the talented princes in past dynasties, he should commission a major literary work, so Li Tai commissioned the work Journal of Geography (Kuodi Zhi) and retained the officials Xiao Deyan (蕭德言), Gu Yin (顧胤), Jiang Yaqing (蔣亞卿), and Xie Yan (謝偃) to head the project. Initially, the work was drafted at Chang'an, and his staff scholars received so many visitors among the noble youths that they were distracted from their work. Li Tai saw that their time was not being productive, and so sent them out to the field—the various prefectures—to collect data and write. It took four years for Li Tai's scholars to complete the work, which had 550 volumes. The work was completed in 642, and Emperor Taizong rewarded Li Tai with a large supply of silk. By this point, Li Tai's staff was growing so large that the imperial stipend to Li Tai exceeded that to Li Chengqian. The official Chu Suiliang suggested to Emperor Taizong that this was improper, and Emperor Taizong agreed—but rather than reducing Li Tai's stipend, he removed all limits on Li Chengqian's spending, which led to Li Chengqian, who was already wasteful in his lifestyle, to be even more wasteful. Emperor Taizong also had Li Tai move to Wude Palace (武德殿), next to Li Chengqian's palace—an action that Wei Zheng considered inappropriate, and so Emperor Taizong reversed.

== Struggles with Li Chengqian ==
Meanwhile, Li Chengqian was losing favor with Emperor Taizong over his wastefulness and favor for games rather than study. He also suffered from a foot illness that the nature was not specified in historical accounts. Li Tai began to have ambitions on displacing his older brother as crown prince, and a number of officials, seeing this as an opportunity, began to congregate around Li Tai, causing the government to divide into Li Tai's faction and Li Chengqian's faction. In 642, in order to dispel rumors that he was about to replace Li Chengqian with Li Tai, Emperor Taizong made Wei Zheng, then ill, Li Chengqian's senior advisor, but that failed to stop the rumors. Meanwhile, Li Tai's chiefs of staff, Wei Ting (韋挺) and Du Chuke (杜楚客, brother to the deceased chancellor Du Ruhui), were making plans for Li Tai to enhance his reputation and defame Li Chengqian, and the public began to perceive Li Chengqian negatively.

By 643, Li Chengqian was so fearful that Emperor Taizong was about to depose him that he conspired with a number of officials, including the major general Hou Junji, Emperor Taizong's brother Li Yuanchang (李元昌) the Prince of Han, the imperial guard commander Li Anyan (李安儼), his cousin Zhao Jie (趙節), and Du Chuke's nephew Du He (杜荷, Du Ruhui's son), to overthrow Emperor Taizong. That summer, however, Li You (李祐) the Prince of Qi, a younger brother to both Li Chengqian and Li Tai, resentful of the head of his household, Quan Wanji (權萬紀), killed Quan and then rebelled. Li You was soon defeated and captured, and when Emperor Taizong investigated Li You's co-conspirators, Li Chengqian's associate Gegan Chengji (紇干承基), who had been an assassin for Li Chengqian and was involved in his conspiracy, was arrested and sentenced to death. Gegan, in order to save himself, revealed the plot. Emperor Taizong, in shock, convened the senior officials Zhangsun Wuji (Empress Zhangsun's brother), Fang Xuanling, Xiao Yu, and Li Shiji, as well as officials from the supreme court, the legislative bureau, and the examination bureau, to investigate, and the extent of the plot was revealed. When Emperor Taizong requested opinions on what to do with Li Chengqian, Lai Ji suggested sparing him, and Emperor Taizong agreed. He deposed Li Chengqian and reduced him to commoner rank, while ordering Li Yuanchang to commit suicide. Hou and the other conspirators were all executed.

== Exile and death ==
After Li Chengqian was arrested, Li Tai visited Emperor Taizong everyday, and Emperor Taizong promised to create him crown prince—an idea that was also suggested by the officials Cen Wenben and Liu Ji. However, Zhangsun Wuji suggested that Li Zhi, also favored by Emperor Taizong, be created crown prince. In order to persuade Emperor Taizong to create him crown prince, Li Tai told Emperor Taizong that he would agree to kill his own son and make Li Zhi crown prince should he be allowed to inherit the throne. However, the statement backfired, as Chu Suiliang pointed out that the statement could not possibly be an honest one, and that in effect, there was the potential that, if Li Tai were created crown prince, the situation between Li Chengqian and Li Tai might repeat itself. Li Tai, meanwhile, made comments to Li Zhi that he should be worried in light of his friendship with Li Yuanchang—comments that Li Zhi told Emperor Taizong, who then began regretting promising Li Tai the crown prince position. Further, when Emperor Taizong visited Li Chengqian to rebuke him, Li Chengqian accused Li Tai of machinations against him, causing him to plot treason. Depressed over the actions of Li Chengqian, Li Tai, Li You, and Li Yuanchang, Emperor Taizong summoned Zhangsun, Fang Xuanling, Li Shiji, and Chu to a private meeting, during which he told them his intent to create Li Zhi crown prince instead. Later that day, when Li Tai tried to enter the palace to visit Emperor Taizong. Emperor Taizong put him under house arrest, and the next day created Li Zhi crown prince.

Several days later, Li Tai was removed from his official posts and reduced in rank to Prince of Donglai. Emperor Taizong exiled his close associates and reduced Du Chuke to commoner rank. Two months later, Li Tai was created the Prince of Shunyang instead. In fall 643, Emperor Taizong exiled both Li Chengqian and Li Tai—in Li Tai's case, to Jun Prefecture (均州, roughly modern Shiyan, Hubei). Emperor Taizong was gut-wrenched about the decision, and he stated:

The love between father and son is a natural one. It is difficult for me to separate from Li Tai, and I cannot bear this. However, I am the lord of all under heaven, and as long as the people can be safe, I can cut off my personal love.

He also showed Li Tai's well-written submissions in the past to his close officials and stated:

Li Tai is exceedingly talented. I miss him, and all of you know this. However, for the sake of the empire, I have to cut off my relationship with him with righteousness. I let him live far away to try to make everyone safe.

In 647, Li Tai's title was upgraded to Prince of Pu. After Emperor Taizong died in 649, Li Zhi succeeded him as Emperor Gaozong. Emperor Gaozong permitted the princes from outlying prefectures to all come to Chang'an to attend Emperor Taizong's funeral, but Li Tai was not permitted to do so. Later that year, Emperor Gaozong did permit Li Tai to again retain a staff, and ordered that he be supplied with high quality supplies of wagons, food, and clothing. Li Tai died in January 653, and his son Li Xin (李欣) inherited his title.

== Family ==
Princess Consort, of the Yan clan (妃阎氏), personal name Wan (婉), daughter of Yan Lide (閻立德) and niece of Yan Liben

  - Li Xin, 2nd Prince of Pu, his successor, who would be accused by secret police officials of Wu Zetian and demoted to lieutenant general of Zhaozhou (昭州), first son
    - Li Jiao (李峤), né Li Yuqing (李余庆), 3rd Prince of Pu, who would be granted Yinqingguangludafu (银青光禄大夫) and serve as Guozijijiu (国子祭酒) and Tongzhengyuan (同正员). Later accused and demoted to lieutenant general of Dengzhou (邓州), later restored
  - Li Hui (李徽), Prince of Xinping, second son
