= Du Ruhui =

Chinese official

Du Ruhui 杜如晦
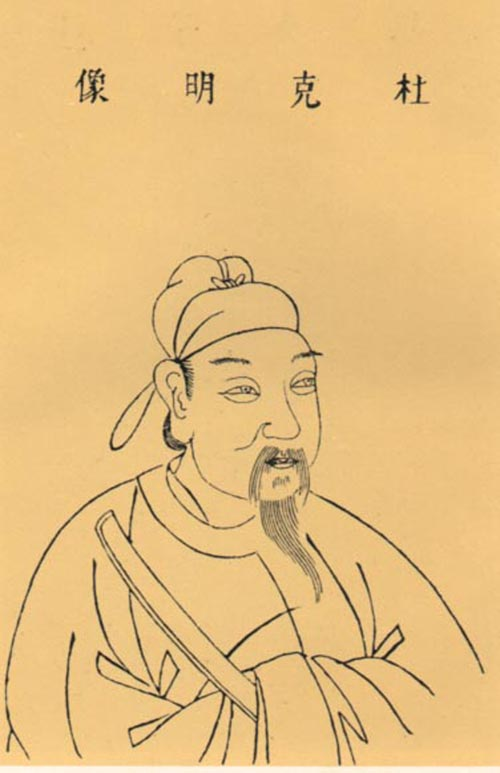
- Portrait of Du Ruhui in the Sancai Tuhui
- Born: 585; Xi'an, Shaanxi, Sui dynasty
- Died: 630 (aged 44–45); Xi'an, Shaanxi, Tang dynasty
- Other names: Keming (克明); Duke Cheng of Lai (萊成公)
- Occupation: Statesman
- Children: Du Gou; Du He
- Father: Du Zha
- Relatives: Du Yan (uncle); Du Chuke (brother)

Du Ruhui (585 – 6 May 630), courtesy name Keming (克明), posthumous name Duke Cheng of Lai (萊成公), was a Chinese official of the Tang dynasty, who served as a chancellor under Emperor Taizong. He and his colleague, Fang Xuanling, were often described as role models for chancellors in imperial China.

== During Sui dynasty ==
Du Ruhui was born in 585, during the reign of Emperor Wen of Sui. He was from the Du clan of Jingzhao, which came from the region around the capital Chang'an. His great-grandfather Du Jiao (杜皎) and grandfather Du Hui (杜徽) were both officials for Sui's predecessor state Northern Zhou, and his granduncle Du Guo (杜果) or Du Gao (杜杲) was particularly well-regarded during Sui. (Note: It appears fairly clear that Du Hui, not Du Guo/Gao (with "Guo" and "Gao" being two easily confused characters), was Du Ruhui's grandfather, but not completely. Du Ruhui's biography in the Old Book of Tang first said that Du Hui was his grandfather, and then said that Du Guo was his grandfather. See Old Book of Tang, vol. 66. The New Book of Tang gave only Du Guo as his grandfather. See New Book of Tang, vol. 96. However, both works referred to the Book of Sui, mentioning that Du Guo's biography was in the Book of Sui -- which, in turn, did not actually have a biography for anyone named Du Guo or Du Gao. See Table of Contents for the Book of Sui. The History of Northern Dynasties, vol. 70, however, contained a biography of Du Gao, the contents of which were consistent with Du Ruhui's biography but did not mention Du Ruhui's father Du Zha as a son -- and made a stray reference to Du Gao's older brother as Du Changhui (杜長暉), which many later historians believed to be intended to be a lead-in to Du Ruhui's family tree. As "Changhui" could be a courtesy name for Du Hui (particularly since Du Gao's courtesy name was mentioned as Zihui (子暉)), those historians of this camp believed that the History of Northern Dynasties biography for Du Gao confirmed that Du Guo/Gao was Du Ruhui's granduncle, not grandfather. The Zizhi Tongjian, for example, referred to Du Ruhui as Du Guo's grandnephew. See Zizhi Tongjian, vol. 179. See also the correspondence between Liao Weiyu (廖位育) and Bo Yang in the appendix of the Bo Yang Edition of the Zizhi Tongjian, vol. 48. The biography of Du Ruhui's uncle Du Yan in the Old Book of Tang -- also in vol. 66 -- gave yet different names for the lineage, giving the names of Du Yan's grandfather as Du Ye (杜業) and father as Du Zheng (杜徵). It might be that Du Yan was not actually an uncle but only someone one generation higher in the Du clan. However, if this is true, the historical accounts gave no indication of such other than the discrepancies in the names of ancestors.) His father Du Zha (杜吒) was a provincial secretary general during Sui. Du Ruhui had at least one older brother, whose name is lost to history, and one younger brother, Du Chuke (杜楚客).

Du Ruhui himself was considered intelligent in his youth, and he often discussed literature and history with others. During Emperor Wen's reign, he participated in the civil service selection process, and the deputy minister of civil service affairs, Gao Xiaoji (高孝基), was particularly impressed with him. Gao gave him the post as a county magistrate, although Du did not remain at that post for long and resigned.

== During Emperor Gaozu's reign ==
In 617, the governor of Taiyuan Li Yuan rebelled against the rule of Emperor Wen's son Emperor Yang, and by 618 had established the Tang dynasty at Chang'an (as its Emperor Gaozu). Du Ruhui served on the staff of Emperor Gaozu's son Li Shimin the Prince of Qin, a major general. At that time, Li Shimin had many talented people on his staff, and soon, many were commissioned to be local officials. Du was scheduled to become the secretary general for Shan Prefecture (陝州, roughly modern Sanmenxia, Henan), when Li Shimin's trusted advisor Fang Xuanling pointed out that Du was highly talented and that Li Shimin could not afford to lose him. Li Shimin thus interceded with Emperor Gaozu to keep Du on his staff. Du later followed Li Shimin in campaigns against Tang's major enemies Xue Rengao the Emperor of Qin, Liu Wuzhou the Dingyang Khan, Wang Shichong the Emperor of Zheng, and Dou Jiande the Prince of Xia, contributing strategies to Li Shimin's campaigns. For his achievements, Du was created the Baron of Jianping. (When the Zheng capital Luoyang fell to Li Shimin in 621, Du Ruhui's uncle Du Yan, a Zheng official, was captured. Du Yan was not on friendly terms with Du Ruhui and his brothers and who had given information to Wang that Du Ruhui's older brother was not faithful to Zheng, causing Wang to execute Du Ruhui's older brother and to imprison Du Ruhui's younger brother Du Chuke. Du Ruhui was originally intending to allow Li Shimin to execute Du Yan, but Du Chuke reasoned with him that even though Du Yan had caused their brother's death, they should not in turn cause an uncle's death. Du Ruhui relented and interceded on Du Yan's behalf, and Du Yan was spared. Du and Fang continued to serve as key advisors for Li Shimin, and it was said that Fang was capable of planning and strategizing, but was not resolute, while Du was capable of making quick and correct decisions, and they divided their strategical responsibilities while on Li Shimin's staff in that manner. (This eventually led to the Chinese proverb "Fang plans and Du decides" (房謀杜斷, Fang mou Du duan), after they became renowned.)

Later in Emperor Gaozu's reign, Li Shimin was locked in an intense rivalry with his older brother Li Jiancheng the Crown Prince, and Fang and Du often suggested that he act first against Li Jiancheng. As both Li Jiancheng and another brother who supported Li Jiancheng, Li Yuanji the Prince of Qi, feared Fang's and Du's strategic capabilities, they falsely accused both Fang and Du and had them demoted out of Li Shimin's staff. In summer 626, when Li Shimin decided to act against Li Jiancheng and Li Yuanji, however, he summoned Fang and Du to his mansion. Fang and Du, initially fearing Emperor Gaozu's orders forbidding them to serve Li Shimin, declined. In anger, Li Shimin sent the general Yuchi Gong to summon Fang and Du, with directions that if they declined again, to kill them. Yuchi, however, was able to persuade them that Li Shimin was in fact intending on acting against Li Jiancheng and Li Yuanji, and so Fang and Du put on disguises as Taoist monks and were able to get to Li Shimin's mansions, where they assisted Li Shimin in planning the ambush against Li Jiancheng and Li Yuanji. Li Shimin subsequently ambushed his brothers at Xuanwu Gate and killed them, and then effectively forced Emperor Gaozu to create him crown prince. Once he was created crown prince, Fang and Du were restored to honored positions on his staff, and soon, Du was made the minister of defense. Two months later, Emperor Gaozu yielded the throne to Li Shimin (as Emperor Taizong).

== During Emperor Taizong's reign ==
Late in 626, when Emperor Taizong personally ranked the contributions of the generals and officials in order to grant them fiefs, Emperor Taizong ranked five of them—Fang Xuanling, Zhangsun Wuji, Du, Yuchi Gong, and Hou Junji to be contributors of the highest grade, and Du was created the Duke of Cai. When Emperor Gaozu's cousin Li Shentong (李神通) the Prince of Huai'an, himself a key general, objected to being ranked below Fang and Du, stating that Fang and Du, in particular, were only bureaucrats, Emperor Taizong pointed out that it was with their strategies that he was able to become emperor, Li Shentong relented, which led to the other objectors to also cease their objections.

In 629, Du, along with Fang, became Puye (僕射), a head of the important executive bureau of the government (尚書省, Shangshu Sheng) and a post considered one for a chancellor. It was said that at this time that the Fang and Du became known as the model for chancellors. During this time, remembering Gao Xiaoji's kindness toward him, he commissioned a stone tablet monument for Gao. Around the new year of 630, however, Du resigned due to illness. By spring 630, he was near death. Emperor Taizong initially sent his crown prince Li Chengqian to visit Du, and then did so himself as well. Du soon died. For a long time, whenever Emperor Taizong received precious items, he would think of Du, and he would send messengers to deliver some of the items to Du's family. He also often wept while talking with Fang, stating, "Both you and Du Ruhui assisted me. Now I only see you, and not him." For reasons unclear, he changed Du's title posthumously to Duke of Lai, with the posthumous name Cheng (成, "successful"). He gave his daughter Princess Chengyang to Du's son Du He (杜荷) in marriage and created Du He the Duke of Xiangyang. (Du Ruhui's oldest son Du Gou (杜構) inherited the title of Duke of Lai.) In 643, when Emperor Taizong commissioned the Portraits at Lingyan Pavilion to commemorate the 24 great contributors to Tang rule, Du's was one of the portraits commissioned.

However, the honored position of the Du clan did not last long. Later in 643, Du He was implicated in a plot with Li Chengqian to overthrow Emperor Taizong (as Li Chengqian, who had by then lost Emperor Taizong's favor, was fearful that Emperor Taizong would depose him and replace him with his brother Li Tai the Prince of Wei). Du He was executed, while Du Gou was exiled.

== Notes and references ==
- Old Book of Tang, vol. 66.
- New Book of Tang, vol. 96.
- Zizhi Tongjian, vols. 179, 189, 190, 191, 192, 193.
