= Li Ke =

Tang dynasty prince (619–653)

- Prince of Yulin; Prince of Wu
- Born: 619
- Died: 6 March 653 (aged 33–34)
- Spouse: Lady Yang Qingxue; Lady Xiao
- Issue: Li Ren (later known as Li Qianli), Prince of Cheng; Li Wei; Li Kun; Li Jing; Princess Xin'an (4th daughter)
Names
- Li Ke (李恪)
- House: House of Li
- Father: Emperor Taizong of Tang
- Mother: Consort Yang, princess of Sui dynasty

Li Ke (Chinese: 李恪; pinyin: Lǐ Kè; 619 – 10 March 653), posthumously known as the Prince of Yùlín (鬱林王), often known by his greater title as the Prince of Wú (吳王), was an imperial prince of the Tang dynasty. As a highly honored son of Emperor Taizong, he was one time considered a possible candidate as crown prince after both his older brother Li Chengqian and younger brother Li Tai were both deposed in 643, but eventually, his younger brother Li Zhi, as a son of Emperor Taizong's wife Empress Zhangsun, was created crown prince and inherited the throne after Emperor Taizong's death in 649 (as Emperor Gaozong), under the insistence of Li Zhi's uncle and Emperor Taizong's brother-in-law Zhangsun Wuji. Zhangsun, however, detested Li Ke, and in 653, he implicated Li Ke in a plot by the official Fang Yi'ai (房遺愛) and had Emperor Gaozong order Li Ke to commit suicide.

== Early life ==
It is not known exactly when Li Ke was born, but he was likely born around 619, as he was the third son of Li Shimin the Prince of Qin, a son of Emperor Gaozu. His mother was Li Shimin's Consort Yang, a daughter of Emperor Yang of Sui and his wife, Empress Xiao, making Li Ke a Sui dynasty imperial legitimate descendant through his mother. Consort Yang would later give birth to a younger brother of Li Ke's, Li Yin (李愔). In 620, Emperor Gaozu created Li Ke the Prince of Changsha, at the same time that his brothers Li Chengqian and Li Tai were also created imperial princes.

== During Emperor Taizong's reign ==
In 626, Li Shimin, in an intense rivalry with his older brother Li Jiancheng the Crown Prince and fearing that Li Jiancheng was about to kill him, ambushed Li Jiancheng and another brother, Li Yuanji the Prince of Qi, who supported Li Jiancheng, at Xuanwu Gate and killed them. He then effectively forced Emperor Gaozu to first create him crown prince and then yield the throne to him (as Emperor Taizong). He created Li Ke the Prince of Han, and in 627 changed Li Ke's title to Prince of Shu, and while initially he was not commissioned with a post outside the capital Chang'an, eventually he was made the commandant at Qi Prefecture (齊州, roughly modern Jinan, Shandong). In 636, his title was changed to Prince of Wu, and he was made the commandant at An Prefecture (安州, roughly modern Xiaogan, Hubei). While at An Prefecture, in 637 Li Ke often out on hunt, damaged people's houses and many farmland, the assistant imperial censor Liu Fan (柳范) submitted an accusation. As a result, Li Ke received excoriation from his father, and was removed from his post, and 300 households were removed from his fief.

In 643, with Li Chengqian, then crown prince, and Li Tai, locked in an intense rivalry, Li Chengqian plotted to overthrow Emperor Taizong and was deposed. Emperor Taizong initially wanted to make Li Tai crown prince, but soon, believing that Li Tai's machinations were responsible for Li Chengqian's downfall, exiled Li Tai as well and created their younger brother, his ninth son Li Zhi the Prince of Jin, the new crown prince, believing Li Zhi to be kind. (Li Chengqian, Li Tai, and Li Zhi were all born of Emperor Taizong's wife Empress Zhangsun.) Later, however, he began to believe that Li Zhi's personality was too weak and worried that he would not be appropriate as an emperor, he showed this his worry once, said he may considered making Li Ke crown prince instead. Li Zhi's uncle Zhangsun Wuji opposed this immediately, and Emperor Taizong did not do so, but an enmity thereafter developed between Zhangsun Wuji and Li Ke.

== During Emperor Gaozong's reign ==
Emperor Taizong died in 649 and was succeeded by Li Zhi (as Emperor Gaozong). As the emperor's older brother, Li Ke was given the highly honored, although without actual power, position of Sikong (司空), and made the commandant at Liang Prefecture (梁州, roughly modern Hanzhong, Shaanxi).

In 652, Emperor Gaozong's sister Princess Gaoyang, Princess Gaoyang's husband Fang Yi'ai (son of the deceased chancellor Fang Xuanling), the general Xue Wanche (薛萬徹), Emperor Gaozong's uncle Li Yuanjing (李元景) the Prince of Jing, and another brother-in-law Chai Lingwu (柴令武), were accused of a treasonous plot to overthrow Emperor Gaozong and make Li Yuanjing emperor. Fang Yi'ai knew that Zhangsun feared and was jealous of Li Ke and had long wanted to find a way to kill Li Ke to remove any hopes from the people that Li Ke would become emperor. He therefore claimed that Li Ke was part of the plot as well, hoping to ingratiate Zhangsun sufficiently to be spared. In spring 653, Emperor Gaozong, at Zhangsun's urging, issued an edict to execute Fang Yi'ai, Xue, and Chai, while ordering Li Yuanjing, Li Ke, and Princesses Gaoyang and Baling (Chai's wife) to commit suicide. (Emperor Gaozong initially wanted to spare Li Yuanjing and Li Ke, but did not do so when Cui Dunli the minister of defense opposed it.) When Li Ke was about to do so, he cursed Zhangsun, stating:

Zhangsun Wuji has stolen imperial power and falsely accused the faithful. The imperial ancestral spirits are watching. Soon your own clan will be slaughtered.

Zhangsun also had Consort Yang and Li Yin reduced to commoner rank and exiled to Ba Prefecture (巴州, roughly modern Bazhong, Sichuan), and Li Ke's four sons, Li Ren (李仁), Li Wei (李瑋), Li Kun (李琨), and Li Jing (李璄) were exiled to the modern Guangdong region. Li Ke's young fourth daughter was sent to Xianling (tomb of Emperor Gaozu of Tang) to be kept under house arrest till 689, upon which time she was created Princess Xin'an. In 660, after Zhangsun's own downfall (at the hands of Emperor Gaozong's wife Empress Wu and her associates), Li Ke was posthumously created the Prince of Yulin, but was not given a posthumous name, nor was his son permitted to inherit the title; rather, Li Rong (李榮), the grandson of Li Xiaogong the Prince of Hejian, was adopted into Li Ke's line and took the title of Marquess of Yulin. Eventually, however, after Li Rong was deposed for an unrelated reason, Li Ren (later known as Li Qianli (李千里)) was permitted to inherit the title, and around 705, during the reign of Emperor Gaozong's son Emperor Zhongzong, Li Ke was posthumously honored again with the title of Sikong and reburied with honor.

== Personal information ==
Consort and their respective issue(s):

- Princess Consort of Wu, of Yang clan of Hongnong (吳王妃弘農楊氏), his cousin
- Concubine, of the Lanling Xiao (蘭陵蕭氏)
  - Li Kun, Prince of Wu (吳王 李琨), 3rd son
- Unknowm
  - Li Ren, Prince of Cheng (城王 李仁), 1st son
  - Li Wei, Prince of Langling (朗陵王 李瑋), 2nd son
  - Li Jing, Prince of Guizheng (歸政郡王 李璄), 4th son
  - Princess Xin'an, fourth daughter (b. 648, d. 717), 1st daughter
    - Married Yuan Sizhong (元思忠), descendant of Tuoba Huang and had issue (three sons
