= Wei Zheng =

Tang Dynasty chancellor (580–643)

Duke of Zheng Wei Zheng
- 魏徵
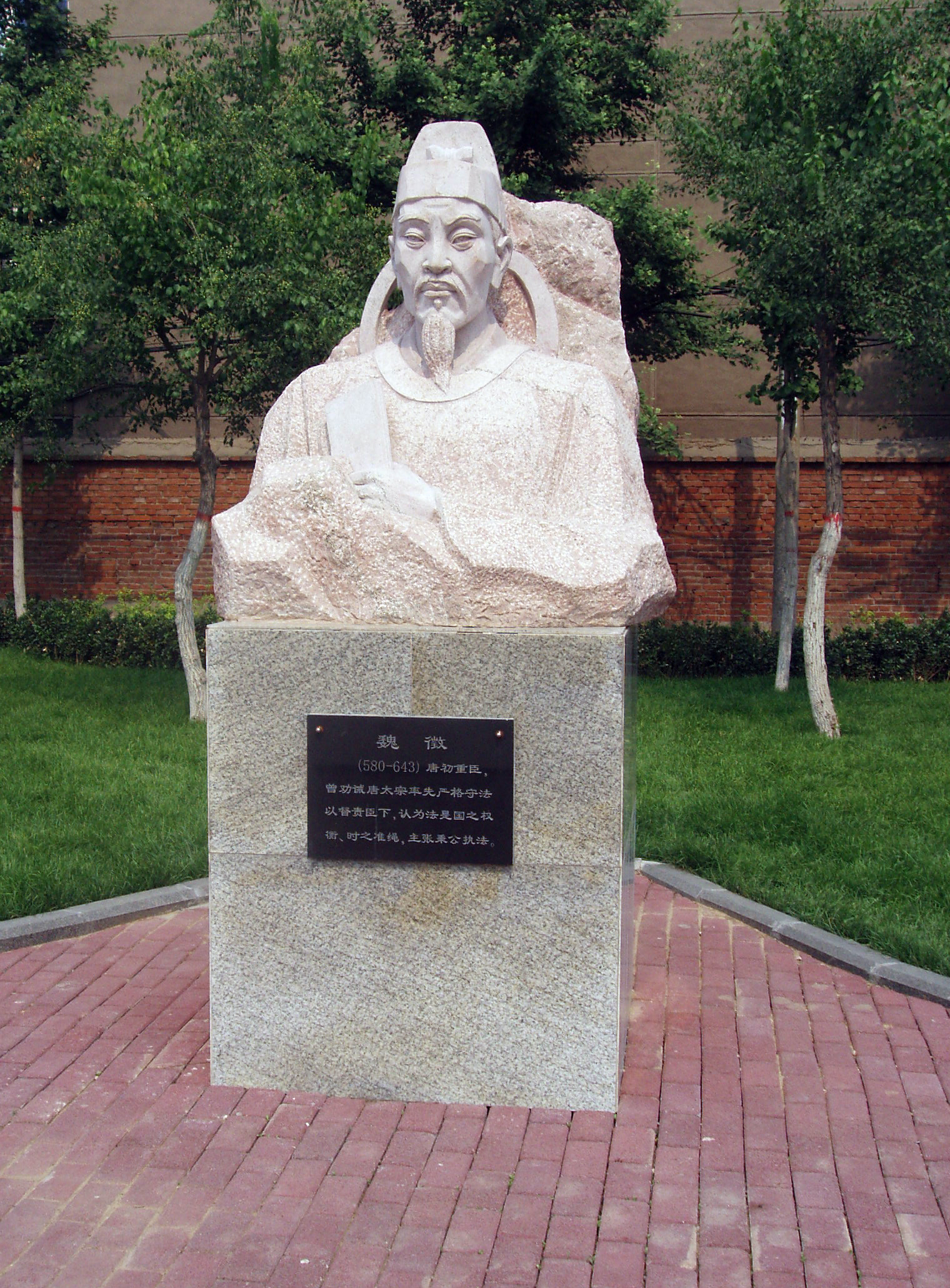
- Statue of Wei Zheng

Grand Preceptor of Crown Prince (太子太師)
- In office 642–643
- Monarch: Emperor Taizong

Palace Attendant (侍中)
- In office 633–636
- Monarch: Emperor Taizong
- Preceded by: Wang Gui
- Succeeded by: Yang Shidao

Supervisor of the Palace Library (秘書監)
- In office 629–633
- Monarch: Emperor Taizong

Left Aide of the Department of State Affairs (尚書左丞)
- In office 627–629
- Monarch: Emperor Taizong

Counsellor of Remonstrance (諫議大夫)
- In office 626–627
- Monarch: Emperor Taizong

Personal details
- Born: 580 Julu Commandery, Zhou
- Died: 643 (aged 62–63) Chang'an, Tang
- Resting place: Zhao Mausoleum, Xianyang
- Spouse: Lady Pei
- Children: Wei Shuyù (魏叔玉); Wei Shuyú (魏叔瑜); Wei Shuwan (魏叔琬); Wei Shulin (魏叔璘)
- Parent: Wei Changxian (魏長賢) (father)
- Notable work: Book of Sui; Qunshu zhiyao

Wei Zheng (580 – 11 February 643), courtesy name Xuancheng, posthumous name Wenzhen, was a Chinese politician and historian. He served as a chancellor of the Tang dynasty for about 13 years during the reign of Emperor Taizong. He was also the lead editor of the official history of the Sui dynasty, the Book of Sui, which was composed in 636.

Wei Zheng was born to a poor family in modern Hebei, and joined Li Mi's rebellion against the Sui dynasty in his youth. After Li Mi's submission to the Tang Empire, Wei Zheng became a Tang official and eventually served on the staff of Li Jiancheng, the Crown Prince and eldest son of Emperor Gaozu, the Tang dynasty's founding emperor. As such, he served against the interests of Li Jiancheng's younger brother, Li Shimin (the Prince of Qin), with whom Li Jiancheng was locked in an intense rivalry. In 626, Li Shimin ambushed and killed Li Jiancheng, and then effectively forced Emperor Gaozu to yield the throne to him.

Rather than punishing Wei Zheng, however, he was impressed with Wei's faithfulness to Li Jiancheng, and he made Wei an important official, eventually a chancellor. Wei Zheng's promotion to this position gave him far broader freedom to criticise others, particularly the emperor, than other officers of the court. He emphasized propriety and opposed overextending the state. His advice and criticism were not always accepted, but in accordance with Confucian etiquette, the emperor would concede to his suggestions with some regularity.

After Wei Zheng's death in 643, the emperor commented that he was a mirror to show the mistakes of the court, and built an elaborate tomb for him near his own imperial tomb and betrothed one of his daughters, Princess Hengshan, to Wei Shuyu (魏叔玉), Wei Zheng's son. Subsequently, as a result of false accusations made by others in the court, the stone monument that Emperor Taizong had built for Wei Zheng was destroyed, and Emperor Taizong cancelled the planned marriage between Princess Hengshan and Wei Shuyu. However, after the failure of the campaign against Goguryeo in 646, Emperor Taizong, believing that Wei Zheng would have stopped him from going on the campaign had he lived longer, restored the stone monument. Wei Zheng's effect and influence has been examined by many historians long after his death. Wei Zheng is also revered as a minor god of doorways in parts of Taiwan.

== Background ==
Wei Zheng was born in 580, shortly before the founding of Sui dynasty in 581. His family was from Julu Commandery (鉅鹿, roughly modern Xingtai, Hebei). His father Wei Changxian (魏長賢) was a county magistrate during Northern Qi. Wei lost his father early in life and was poor, but had great expectations, not caring about making wealth. At one point, he became a Taoist monk. He favored studying, and as he saw that the rule of Emperor Yang of Sui was beginning to make Sui fall into a state of confusion, he particularly paid attention to strategic works.

== Service under Li Mi ==
At the end of Emperor Yang's reign, there were many rebellions against Sui rule. One of the major ones was led by Li Mi the Duke of Wei. In 617, the secretary general of Wuyang Commandery (武陽, part of modern Handan, Hebei), Yuan Baozang (元寶藏), rebelled against the Sui as well and submitted to Li Mi. He invited Wei Zheng to serve on his staff, as his secretary. Wei subsequently drafted submissions from Yuan to Li Mi, suggesting that Li Mi attack and seize nearby Wei Commandery (魏郡, also part of modern Handan) and a large food storage that Emperor Yang built, Liyang Storage (黎陽倉, in modern Hebi, Henan). Li Mi was impressed, and when he found out that Wei wrote the submissions, he requested Yuan send Wei to him. He subsequently made Wei his secretary.

In 618, Li Mi was ready for a major confrontation with the Sui general Wang Shichong, who had seized power at the eastern capital Luoyang as the regent to Sui's last emperor Yang Tong (Emperor Yang's grandson). Wei spoke with Li Mi's secretary general Zheng Ting (鄭頲), advocating that Li Mi take a defensive stance, refusing to engage Wang and draining Wang's food supplies. Zheng rejected the proposal, and the proposal apparently was never submitted to Li Mi. Subsequently, when Li Mi engaged Wang, Wang defeated him. Believing that he could no longer hold out against Wang, Li Mi fled to Tang dynasty territory and surrendered to Emperor Gaozu of Tang. Wei followed him to Tang territory. Subsequently, with Li Mi's major general Xu Shiji (later known as Li Shiji) still holding the Liyang region, Wei requested that Emperor Gaozu send him to Liyang to persuade Xu to submit to Tang as well. Xu did so.

== Emperor Gaozu's reign ==
In spring 619, with Yuan Baozang being attacked by Yuwen Huaji the Emperor of Xu (who had led the coup that killed Emperor Yang in 618), Wei went to Yuan to persuade him to submit to Tang. Yuan did so. Wei apparently subsequently went back to Liyang. In winter 619, when Dou Jiande the Prince of Xia, one of Tang's major rivals, attacked and captured Liyang, Wei was among the people captured by Dou, along with Emperor Gaozu's cousin Li Shentong (李神通) the Prince of Huai'an, Emperor Gaozu's sister Princess Tong'an, and Li Shiji's father Li Gai (李蓋). (Li Shiji was not captured, but several days later felt compelled to surrender to Dou as well, as his father had become a captive.) Dou made Wei his secretary.

In 621, Dou, while trying to aid Wang, under siege at Luoyang by the Tang general Li Shimin the Prince of Qin (Emperor Gaozu's son), was defeated and captured by Li Shimin. The Xia officials initially fled back to the Xia capital Ming Prefecture (洺州, in modern Handan as well) subsequently decided to surrender, and Wei followed Pei Ju back to the Tang capital Chang'an. Emperor Gaozu's oldest son Li Jiancheng the Crown Prince had long heard of Wei's talents, and he invited Wei to serve as his librarian. In 622, with Dou's general Liu Heita having risen against Tang and captured most of former Xia territory, Wei and another staff member, Wang Gui, suggested to Li Jiancheng that due to Li Shimin's accomplishments and fame, he posed a threat to Li Jiancheng, and that Li Jiancheng needed some victories of his own—indicating that he should volunteer to attack Liu. Li Jiancheng agreed, and later in 622 crushed Liu's forces. (Liu was betrayed by his own subordinate Zhuge Dewei (諸葛德威) in early 623 and turned over to Li Jiancheng; Li Jiancheng killed him.) As the brothers' rivalry intensified over the year, Wei repeatedly suggested to Li Jiancheng that he must act first and kill Li Shimin. Li Jiancheng could not resolve to do so.

In 626, however, Li Shimin, believing that Li Jiancheng would kill him, ambushed Li Jiancheng and another brother who supported Li Jiancheng, Li Yuanji the Prince of Qi, at Xuanwu Gate, killing them. He then effectively forced Emperor Gaozu to create him crown prince. He summoned Wei and rebuked him, "Why did you alienate us brothers?" Wei's colleagues were all fearful for him, but Wei, instead of begging for forgiveness, stated boldly, "If the Crown Prince had listened to my words, he would not have suffered this disaster." Li Shimin, who had been impressed with Wei himself, was further impressed by the answer, and he changed his attitude and treated Wei with respect, inviting Wei to serve on his own staff. Subsequently, when he sent Wei on a mission to pacify the eastern prefectures, Wei, believing that no one would believe Li Shimin's words that Li Jiancheng's and Li Yuanji's staff members would be spared if some of them, then under arrest, were not released, ordered them released—an act that Li Shimin was pleased with and impressed by. Later in 626, Emperor Gaozu yielded the throne to Li Shimin (as Emperor Taizong). Wei continued to serve in the imperial administration.

== Emperor Taizong's reign ==
After Emperor Taizong took the throne, he created Wei the Baron of Julu. Later in 626, when Emperor Taizong buried Li Jiancheng and Li Yuanji with honors due imperial princes, Wei Zheng and Wang Gui requested permission to attend the funeral procession. Emperor Taizong agreed, and further ordered that all officials who served on Li Jiancheng's and Li Yuanji's staffs to attend the funeral procession.

It was said that when Emperor Taizong first took the throne, he was looking for ways to improve his reign. As he believed that Wei had great abilities in governance, he often invited Wei into his own bedroom to converse with him. Wei had the fortitude to speak up for what he saw to be right, and Emperor Taizong often gladly accepted his suggestions. In 627, when it was rumored that Feng Ang (馮盎), a former Sui official who had submitted to Tang several years prior, had started a rebellion, and Emperor Taizong wanted to send forces to attack Feng, Wei advised against it, pointing out that Feng did not advance outside his own territories and appeared to be simply fearful that he had been accused of treason. Under Wei's suggestion, Emperor Taizong sent the official Li Gongyan (李公淹) to comfort Feng; Feng then showed his submission by sending his son Feng Zhidai (馮智戴) to follow Li Gongyan to Chang'an to pay homage to Emperor Taizong. Pleased, Emperor Taizong stated, "Wei had me send a messenger, and as a result the Lingnan region was pacified, better than if 100,000 men were sent. He must receive an award." He awarded Wei with silk. Around that time, he also made Wei a deputy head of the Department of State Affairs.

Later that year, Wei was accused of nepotism. Emperor Taizong had the imperial censor Wen Yanbo investigate, and Wen found no evidence of wrongdoing. Wen nevertheless stated to Emperor Taizong, "Wei did not care about public perception or appearance of conflict of interest. Even though he had no wrongful intent, he should still be rebuked." Emperor Taizong agreed and rebuked Wei, but Wei bluntly refused to accept the rebuke, and Emperor Taizong later retracted the rebuke after concluding that Wei was correct. Throughout the rest of Wei's career, this became a pattern—that Wei would dare to speak against the emperor's opinions or acts despite Emperor Taizong's anger, and while Emperor Taizong did not accept everything that Wei said, he always treated Wei with respect.

In 629, Emperor Taizong made Wei the head of the Palace Library, but gave him the additional designation Canyu Chaozheng (參豫朝政), making him a de facto chancellor. Later that year, when the assistant censor Quan Wanji (權萬紀) accused the chancellors Fang Xuanling and Wang Gui of improper selection of officials, Emperor Taizong initially ordered Hou Junji to investigate. Wei, however, pointed out that both Fang and Wang were trusted officials who should be given free rein and not have the details of their acts be picked on. Emperor Taizong agreed and cancelled the investigations.

In 630, the general Li Jing had inflicted a heavy blow to the forces of Eastern Tujue's Jiali Khan Ashina Duobi, and later that year, after Ashina Duobi was captured, Eastern Tujue chieftains submitted to Tang. Emperor Taizong requested opinions on what to do with Eastern Tujue's people. There were many different opinions, but the two opinions that Emperor Taizong appeared to consider the most were the ones by Wen and Wei, who debated extensively before Emperor Taizong. Wen argued that, pursuant to precedents of what Eastern Han dynasty did with the Xiongnu, the Eastern Tujue people should be placed within Tang borders but organized in tribal form, to serve as a defense perimeter on the northern border. Wei advocated that the Eastern Tujue people be placed north of Tang borders, believing that they would pose a threat if placed within Tang borders. Wen, however, argued that the Eastern Tujue people could eventually be assimilated and become an asset to the Tang state, and Emperor Taizong agreed with Wen. He established 10 prefectures to settle the Eastern Tujue people and made the major chieftains the prefects, while inviting a number of Eastern Tujue nobles to serve as generals at Chang'an.

Late in 630, Qu Wentai (麴文泰), the king of Gaochang, was set to arrive at Chang'an to pay homage to Emperor Taizong. When the other Xiyu states heard this, they wanted to send emissaries as well, and Emperor Taizong initially ordered Qu's official Yanda Gegan (厭怛紇干) back to Gaochang to gather the emissaries to lead them to Chang'an. Wei advised against doing so—pointing out that if that happened, Tang would become deeply involved in Xiyu matters, and that the Tang state was not yet in a position of doing so. Emperor Taizong agreed and ordered Yanda to stop.

In 631, despite Wei's advice against it, Emperor Taizong began setting up a feudal scheme where the great contributors to Tang rule would be granted posts as prefectural prefects, to be inherited by their descendants. (Subsequently, however, due to other officials' opposition—the strongest of which came from Emperor Taizong's brother-in-law Zhangsun Wuji—Emperor Taizong cancelled the feudal scheme.)

In 632, at the urgings of many officials who believed that he should go to Mount Tai to pay homage to heaven and earth (known as Fengshan), Emperor Taizong considered doing so, but Wei opposed, and this led to a famous conversation between them, which showcased Wei's personal philosophy against overextending the state:

Emperor Taizong asked, "You oppose my conducting of Fengshan. Is it that my accomplishments were not great enough?" Wei responded, "They are great enough." Emperor Taizong asked, "Is it that my virtues were not great enough?" Wei responded, "They are great enough." Emperor Taizong asked, "Is it that China is not pacified enough?" Wei responded, "It is pacified enough." Emperor Taizong asked, "Is it that the barbaric nations have not submitted to me?" Wei responded, "They have." Emperor Taizong asked, "Is it that we have not had good harvests?" Wei responded, "We have had good harvests." Emperor Taizong asked, "Is it that signs of blessings have not occurred?" Wei responded, "They have." Emperor Taizong asked, "Then, why is it that I still cannot conduct Fengshan?"
Wei responded, "Even though Your Imperial Majesty has accomplished these six achievements, we are still inheriting the state left after the great confusion at the end of Sui rule. The population is greatly reduced and has not recovered. The food stores are still empty. When Your Imperial Majesty heads east [to Mount Tai], the thousands of horses and wagons require supplies everywhere they go, and it is difficult for the local government to do so. In addition, at Fengshan, the rulers and chiefs of the nations should all attend you. However, from the Yi and Luo Rivers to the Sea and Mount Dai [(岱山, another name for Mount Tai)], there are still few villages and few people. The weeds grow thickly without end, and this would be inviting barbarians to our abdomen and showing them our weaknesses. Further, even if we greatly reward them, they would not necessarily be pleased, having come from afar. Even if you exempt the people from taxes for many years, you still cannot compensate them for their losses. Why would Your Imperial Majesty want to simply hold a great Fengshan ceremony but receive real detriments?"

Incidentally, at that time, many prefectures around the Yellow River were suffering floods, so Emperor Taizong gave up the idea.

Around the same time, there was an incident when Emperor Taizong visited his summer palace Jiucheng Palace (九成宮, in modern Baoji, Shaanxi). He sent some of his servants back to Chang'an, and they were staying at the official lodges at Weichuan County (湋川, also in modern Baoji), when the chancellors Li Jing and Wang Gui arrived. The county officials displaced the imperial servants to house Li and Wang. When Emperor Taizong heard this, he felt disrespected, and initially were going to punish the county officials. Wei disagreed, pointing out that Li and Wang were far more important and honored than the imperial servants. Emperor Taizong relented and did not punish the county officials, Li, or Wang.

Emperor Taizong was about to marry the Princess Changle to Zhangsun Wuji's son Zhangsun Chong (長孫沖). As the princess was born of Empress Zhangsun and was his favorite daughter, Emperor Taizong ordered that her dowry had to exceed that for his sister, the Princess Yongjia. Wei advised against it, pointing out that this was contrary to Emperor Ming of Han's observation that his sons should not be as honored as his brothers. Emperor Taizong agreed and also informed Empress Zhangsun, who was greatly impressed with Wei's honest advice, and therefore, after receiving permission from Emperor Taizong, she had her eunuchs send rewards of money and silk to Wei, praising him for his honesty. On another occasion, after Emperor Taizong returned from an imperial gathering, he was angry and yelled, "Let me find a chance to kill this farmer!" Empress Zhangsun asked whom he was referring to, and he replied, "I am referring to Wei Zheng. He always find a way to insult me in front of everyone in the imperial hall!" Empress Zhangsun retreated to her bedchambers and put on the official empress gown; standing solemnly, she prepared to bow to Emperor Taizong. He was surprised, and asked her what the reason was. She responded, "I have heard that only a most able emperor will have subordinates who have integrity. Wei shows this much integrity because you are an able emperor. How can I not congratulate you?" Emperor Taizong's anger turned to happiness, and he did not punish Wei. Soon, Wei was created a duke.

Later that year, there was an occasion when Emperor Taizong held a feast for the high-level officials at Danxiao Hall (丹霄殿), and at the feast, Zhangsun Wuji made the comment, "Wang Gui and Wei Zheng were our enemies before. I did not know at the time that we would get the chance to feast together." Emperor Taizong responded, "Wang and Wei served their master faithfully, and that was why I retained them. I do have a question: Every time that Wei gave me adverse advice and I did not accept it, then he refused to discuss the matter any further. Why?" Wei responded, "I give adverse advise only when I believe that something should not be done. If Your Imperial Majesty did not follow my advice, then if I continued to speak about it, the matter would be settled and would be done. That is why I spoke no further." Emperor Taizong responded, "You can first continue planning and then try to advise me again. What harm is there?" Wei responded, "It was written that Emperor Shun warned his officials, 'Do not obey me in my presence and make secret speeches against what I do.' If I know that something is wrong, but I continue to discuss it with Your Imperial Majesty, then I would be obeying you in your presence. That is not how Houji (后稷) and Ziqi (子棄, both legendary great officials during Emperor Shun's reign) served Emperor Shun." Emperor Taizong laughed and stated, "Everyone says that Wei is arrogant and careless, but I call him 'delicate'; this shows it."

In 633, after Wang was accused of leaking palace secrets, Emperor Taizong made Wei Shizhong (侍中) -- the head of the examination bureau of government and a chancellor post—to replace Wang. At that time, there were also a large backlog of legal matters being handled by the executive bureau, and Emperor Taizong temporarily assigned Wei to handle them. It was said that while Wei did not study law, he reasoned logically, and he was able to make proper decisions.

In 634, when Emperor Taizong wanted to send officials to visit the circuits to see how the people were doing in the provinces, Li Jing recommended Wei. Emperor Taizong, however, responded, "Wei needs to point out my faults, and I cannot let him go." Instead, he sent 13 officials, including Li Jing and Xiao Yu, out to the circuits for this mission.

Emperor Taizong had commissioned the compilation of several official histories of Tang's predecessor dynasties—commissioning Linghu Defen and Cen Wenben to compile the Book of Zhou (Northern Zhou's history); Kong Yingda and Xu Jingzong to compile the Book of Sui (Sui dynasty's history); Yao Silian to compile the Book of Liang (Liang dynasty's history) and Book of Chen (Chen dynasty's history); and Li Baiyao to compile the Book of Northern Qi (Northern Qi's history). Wei was in charge of writing commentaries on a number of important persons whose biographies were contained in these histories, and after the histories were completed around 636, Emperor Taizong awarded him silk and upgraded his title to Duke of Zheng. (For reasons unclear, Wei was given credit as the lead editor of the Book of Sui, but not the other works.)

Also in 636, Wei tried to resign on account of eye illnesses. Emperor Taizong relieved him from his post as Shizhong and gave him the honorific post of Tejin (特進), but still gave him full authority as if he were still Shizhong. He also continued to designate him Canyi Deshi (參議得失), keeping him as a de facto chancellor.

By this point, Emperor Taizong had begun to favor his son Li Tai over his oldest son and crown prince Li Chengqian. When accusations were made that the high-level officials were disrespectful to Li Tai, Emperor Taizong was initially angry, rebuking the high-level officials. However, Wei responded that those high-level officials should, in fact, be more honored than the imperial princes, as the state's key personnel, and Emperor Taizong, seeing that Wei was correct, apologized.

In 637, a new code of rites, coauthored by Wei and Fang, was completed. Also in 637, Wei submitted a petition containing a number of advice for Emperor Taizong to continuously examine himself. This petition was later titled the Petition on Ten Thoughts (十思疏) and became a famous document often held up as examples of how officials should advise the emperor.

In 638, there was yet another incident where Wang, by then the minister of ceremonies, suggested that high-level officials should not have to yield to imperial princes when their processions meet. Emperor Taizong initially saw this as an insult to the imperial princes—particularly Li Tai, whom he was secretly considering replacing Li Chengqian with—and he made the statement, "Life is uncertain. If the Crown Prince should die early, how do you know that one of the princes would not be your lord in the future. How can you disrespect them?" Wei, seeing what was happening, spoke bluntly, "Ever since the Zhou dynasty, succession is always from father to son, not to brothers, to prevent plotting by younger sons and stop infighting at their origin. This is what the rulers need to be careful about." Emperor Taizong thereafter approved Wang's proposal.

In 638, Emperor Taizong, celebrating the birth of a grandson, held a feast for imperial officials, at which he made the comment:

Before I took the throne, it was by Fang Xuangling's assistance that I was able to seize power. After I took the throne, it was by Wei Zheng's assistance that I was able to have my errors corrected.

He then awarded both Fang and Wei an imperial sword. Also around that time, Wei advised him to be cognizant that he was not accepting adverse advice from others as he had previously. Emperor Taizong agreed to examine himself more carefully.

In 639, after Ashina Duobi's nephew Ashina Jiesheshuai formed a plot to ambush Emperor Taizong, but his plot was discovered and destroyed, Emperor Taizong created a Tujue prince who had served him faithfully, Li Simo (né Ashina Simo) the Prince of Huaihua, as the khan of a newly recreated Eastern Tujue state (as Qilibi Khan), and had him take the Eastern Tujue people outside of Tang territory, to be settled between Tang and Xueyantuo. At that time, Emperor Taizong made the comment that he nearly suffered because he did not listen to Wei's suggestion in 630.

In 640, after a number of years during which Qu Wentai, initially submissive to Tang, became hostile to Tang interests and had allied himself with Western Tujue, Emperor Taizong sent Hou Junji to conquer Gaochang. Qu Wentai died from illness during the siege, and his son Qu Zhisheng (麴智盛) surrendered. Wei advised that Emperor Taizong should keep Qu on the throne, as an ally—a suggestion that Chu Suiliang also spoke of—but Emperor Taizong disagreed and annexed Gaochang directly. (Emperor Taizong would later regret this in 642, when the need to station soldiers at Gaochang became more and more expensive in monetary and human costs.) When Hou's lieutenant Xue Wanjun (薛萬均) was subsequently accused of raping Gaochang women, Emperor Taizong was going to hold cross-examination sessions between Xue and the alleged victims, but on Wei's urging—that whatever the results were, the empire would be harmed—Emperor Taizong cancelled the investigation.

In 641, Fang and Gao Shilian drew rebuke from Emperor Taizong when they inquired of the deputy imperial architect, Dou Desu (竇德素) of imperial construction projects — which Emperor Taizong saw as an encroachment on his liberty. However, Wei pointed out that chancellors were supposed to be responsible for all affairs of state, and Emperor Taizong, realizing that he had erred, was humbled.

In 642, Wei was ill, and Emperor Taizong and he exchanged letters with each other expressing how they missed each other, and in Wei's letters, he continued to give adverse advice to Emperor Taizong. Meanwhile, as Wei's mansion had no large halls, Emperor Taizong diverted the construction material that he was going to use for an imperial hall and constructed a hall for Wei in five days, and further awarded him with folding screens, bedding, a small table, and canes, hoping to comfort him. When Wei wrote to thank him, Emperor Taizong wrote back, stating, "I honor you for the people and the state, not for you. Why thank me?" Meanwhile, Chu, himself by now developing a reputation for offering adverse advice, was pointing out that Emperor Taizong's favors for Li Tai were creating uncertainties for officials, and Emperor Taizong, trying to stem the rumors that Li Tai would displace Li Chengqian, appointed Wei as a senior advisor to Li Chengqian. When Wei grew better, he personally went to the palace to decline, but Emperor Taizong pointed out the symbolic importance of having someone as important as himself serve as Li Chengqian's advisor, stating that even if Wei could only lie on the bed, his being named a senior advisor to Li Chengqian would help clarify the situation. Wei relented and accepted.

In spring 643, Wei was gravely ill. Emperor Taizong sent numerous messengers to attend to Wei's illness, and further had the official Li Anyan (李安儼) stay at Wei's mansion to oversee Wei's care. He also personally visited Wei, with Li Chengqian, and he pointed at his daughter Princess Hengshan and promised to give her to Wei's son Wei Shuyu in marriage. Wei died soon thereafter, and Emperor Taizong buried Wei with great honors and luxurious funeral supplies, although Wei's wife Lady Pei, pointing out that Wei was himself frugal in living, declined most of the luxuries. Wei was buried near the tomb of Empress Zhangsun (who died in 636), where Emperor Taizong would eventually himself be buried. He also commissioned a stone monument for Wei, and personally wrote the text of the monument. He missed Wei greatly and stated:

Using copper as a mirror allows one to keep his clothes neat. Using history as a mirror allows one to see the future trends. Using a person as a mirror allows one to see what is right and what is wrong. When Wei Zheng died, I lost a mirror.

Later that year, when Emperor Taizong commissioned the Portraits at Lingyan Pavilion to commemorate the 24 great contributors to Tang rule, Wei's was one of the portraits commissioned.

Later in 643, however, Li Chengqian was found to have plotted with Hou to overthrow Emperor Taizong, as he was apprehensive that Emperor Taizong would displace him with Li Tai. Emperor Taizong executed Hou and the other coconspirators, while deposing and exiling Li Chengqian (although he also blamed Li Tai's machinations for Li Chengqian's downfall and exiled him as well, creating their younger brother Li Zhi crown prince instead). As Wei had previously repeatedly recommended Hou and Du Zhenglun, a key advisor to Li Chengqian who was also exiled, as chancellor material, Emperor Taizong suspected Wei of factionalism. Also, it was discovered at the time that Wei had recorded his adverse advice to Emperor Taizong and given them to Chu, who was the imperial historian as well, displeasing Emperor Taizong further. He therefore cancelled the planned marriage between Princess Hengshan and Wei Shuyu and destroyed the stone monument that he had commissioned for Wei.

In 645, after Emperor Taizong carried out a failed attempt to conquer Goguryeo, he regretted the campaign and stated, "If Wei Zheng were still alive, he would not have allowed me to go on this campaign." He sent imperial messengers to make sacrifices to Wei and restore the stone monument, and he also summoned Wei's wife and children, greatly awarding them.

== Veneration ==
Wei Zheng is venerated as a door god in some Chinese and Taoist temples, usually in partnership with Li Shiji.

== Popular culture ==
- Portrayed by Maeng Ho-rim in 2006-2007 SBS TV series Yeon Gaesomun.

== See also ==
- Twenty-Four Histories
