= Li Chengqian =

Crown Prince of the Tang dynasty (619–645)

- Prince of Hengshan 恆山王

Crown Prince of the Tang dynasty
- Reign: September 626-April 643
- Born: 619; Taiji Palace, Chang'an, Tang China
- Died: 5 January 645 (aged 25–26); Qianzhou, Tang China
- Spouse: Lady Su (m.9 February 635; elder sister of Su Gui (苏瓌), eldest daughter of Su Dan (苏亶) and great-granddaughter of Su Wei).)
- Issue: Li Xiang (李象; father of Li Shizhi); Li Jue
Posthumous name
- Prince Min of Hengshan (恆山愍王)
- Father: Emperor Taizong of Tang
- Mother: Empress Zhangsun

Li Chéngqián (Chinese: 李承乾; 619 – 5 January 645), courtesy name Gaoming (高明), posthumous name Prince Min of Hengshan (恆山愍王), was a crown prince of the Chinese Tang dynasty. He was Emperor Taizong's oldest son and first crown prince, but was replaced later by his younger brother Li Zhi (the eventual Emperor Gaozong).

Li Chengqian was created crown prince in 626 at the age of eight (by East Asian reckoning), after his father became emperor on 4 September. In his youth, he had a reputation for good judgment, but was also said to be suffering from a foot illness. Later on, he was said to be frivolous, favoring Tujue customs instead of studying about ways to rule an empire. He lost favor in Emperor Taizong's eyes to a younger brother, Li Tai the Prince of Wei. (Both had the same mother, Emperor Taizong's wife Empress Zhangsun.) In 643, in fear that Emperor Taizong was about to depose him in favor of Li Tai, he plotted with the general Hou Junji to overthrow Emperor Taizong. The plot was discovered, and he was deposed and reduced to commoner rank, but Emperor Taizong, believing that Li Tai to be responsible for Li Chengqian's downfall, appointed yet another son, Li Zhi (also by Empress Zhangsun), crown prince instead. Li Chengqian was exiled, and died in exile in January 645, as a commoner under house arrest. He was posthumously granted the noble title of Prince of Hengshan with the posthumous name Min during the reign of his grandnephew, Emperor Xuanzong after his grandson Li Shizhi became chancellor.

== Family ==
Wife:

- Crown Princess Su, of the Su clan of Wugong (太子妃 武功苏氏), eldest daughter of Su Dan (苏亶)

Children:

- Li Xiang, Duke Huan (郇国公李象, 16 May 638 - in or after 694), 1st son
- Li Jue, Inspector of Qingzhou Province (青州刺史李厥), 3rd son
- Li Yi (李医), 2nd son

== Early life ==
Li Chengqian was born in 619, not long after his grandfather Emperor Gaozu established Tang dynasty in 618. He was the first son of Emperor Gaozu's son Li Shimin the Prince of Qin and Li Shimin's wife Princess Zhangsun, and was named Chengqian because he was born at Chengqian Hall (承乾殿). In 620, he was created the Prince of Hengshan, at the same time that his younger brothers Li Ke and Li Tai were also created princes.

== Early years as crown prince ==
In 626, Li Shimin seized power after ambushing and killing his older brother Li Jiancheng, the Crown Prince, and younger brother Li Yuanji, the Prince of Qi, at the Incident at Xuanwu Gate, and later that year, Emperor Gaozu yielded the throne to him (as Emperor Taizong). Emperor Taizong created Li Chengqian's mother Princess Zhangsun empress, and created Li Chengqian crown prince. In 630, in order to show honor to the chancellor Du Ruhui in Du's illness, Emperor Taizong sent Li Chengqian to personally visit Du. Later that year, Emperor Taizong formally made Li Chengqian in charge of listening to legal appeals where the litigants were dissatisfied with the judgments made by the executive bureau of the government (尚書省, Shangshu Sheng), putting a layer of appeal between the executive bureau and the emperor himself. The senior officials Li Gang (李綱) and Xiao Yu were made his senior advisors, and whenever Li Chengqian were officially hearing governmental matters, he would be accompanied by Li Gang and the chancellor Fang Xuanling. In 631, he held his official rite of passage. In winter 632, after a feast Emperor Taizong held for Emperor Gaozu (then with the title Taishang Huang (retired emperor)) at Emperor Gaozu's Da'an Palace (大安宮), Emperor Taizong wanted to hold up Emperor Gaozu's litter personally; Emperor Gaozu disallowed it, but had Li Chengqian take Emperor Taizong's place in doing so. Meanwhile, by 633, Li Chengqian was said to be beginning to favor frivolous games, and his staff members Yu Zhining, Du Zhenglun, and Kong Yingda often advised him to not do so. Emperor Taizong approved of Yu, Du, and Kong, and rewarded them.

On 25 June 635, Emperor Gaozu died. Emperor Taizong observed a period of mourning for him. During that time, Li Chengqian formally ruled on important matters of state for about 45 days, after which Emperor Taizong resumed his imperial authority, but still had Li Chengqian rule on more minor issues. It was around this time that Li Chengqian was said to have good judgment and logical abilities. From this point on, whenever Emperor Taizong was away from the capital Chang'an, Li Chengqian would be in charge of the imperial government.

In 636, Li Chengqian's mother Empress Zhangsun was seriously ill. Li Chengqian suggested to her that a general pardon be declared and that people be encouraged to become Buddhist or Taoist monks to try to gain divine favor. Empress Zhangsun disallowed it, disfavoring pardons herself and knowing that Emperor Taizong also disapproved of Buddhism and Taoism. Li Chengqian then discussed the matter with Fang, who relayed his request to Emperor Taizong. Emperor Taizong wanted to declare a general pardon, but was dissuaded by Empress Zhangsun. She died later that year, on 28 July.

== Struggles against Li Tai ==
By this point, Li Tai, who was considered intelligent and talented in literature, had gained Emperor Taizong's favor over Li Chengqian—so much so that in 638, Emperor Taizong let it slip out that it was not impossible that an imperial prince would one day be his officials' overlord, when Wang Gui suggested that high level officials not be required to bow to imperial princes other than the crown prince. Li Chengqian, meanwhile, was allowing his games to interfere with his studies, despite urgings of his advisor Zhang Xuansu (張玄素). At one point, after Zhang expressed disapproval of his playing drums, Li Chengqian destroyed his drums, but was not otherwise listening to Zhang's advice.

In 641, When Emperor Taizong visited the eastern capital Luoyang, Li Chengqian was in charge of Chang'an, assisted by the chancellor Gao Shilian (his granduncle). Around that time, Li Chengqian had gathered a group of guards who served as his personal assassins, and when he grew angry at the earnest urgings by Yu Zhining, he sent his assassins Zhang Shizheng (張師政) and Gegan Chengji (紇干承基) to kill Yu, although Zhang and Gegan, when they saw that Yu was observing a mourning period for his mother, relented and did not kill Yu. Meanwhile, in 642, with Li Tai engaging many scholars on staff, Emperor Taizong had increased Li Tai's stipend so much that it exceeded Li Chengqian's. The official Chu Suiliang, whose advice Emperor Taizong usually listened to, advised against this, believing that this would bring conflict. Instead, Emperor Taizong removed all limits on Li Chengqian's spending, causing Li Chengqian to be wasteful. When Zhang advised against wastefulness, Li Chengqian became so displeased that he sent servants to attack Zhang with large whips, almost killing him. With Emperor Taizong's favors for Li Tai apparent, there began to be a faction that supported Li Chengqian and a faction that supported Li Tai at court. In order to quell the speculations about Li Tai's replacing Li Chengqian, Emperor Taizong made the honored chancellor Wei Zheng Li Chengqian's senior advisor, but this failed to end the rumors. The rumors also continued to persist even after Emperor Taizong publicly declared in spring 643 that even if Li Chengqian died (as Li Chengqian's foot illness—the historical accounts did not specify what kind of illness—was well known among the officials), Li Chengqian's son Li Xiang (李象) would inherit the throne, not another prince.

It was said that Li Chengqian favored music and hunting, and was wasteful in pursuing these things, but at the same time maintained a veneer of virtue to the outside world. Among his guards, he often took on Turkic customs, wearing Turkic clothes, spoke Turkic, and engaging in Turkic-style camping. Meanwhile, several other acts of Li Chengqian were also drawing Emperor Taizong's ire. Li Chengqian had a teenage musician (aged 13-19) as his catamite, whom he nicknamed Chengxin (稱心, meaning, "satisfying my heart"). He had also favored Taoist monks Qin Ying (秦英) and Wei Lingfu (韋靈符), and he had them use magic, acts that were considered extremely disapproved among imperial subjects. When Emperor Taizong found out about these things, he put Chengxin and the Taoist monks all to death. Li Chengqian, believing that it was Li Tai who informed Emperor Taizong, became increasingly angry with Li Tai, and he, in sadness over Chengxin's death, also refused to attend imperial gatherings for months, while establishing a shrine for Chengxin within his palace.

== Removal and death ==
Meanwhile, Li Tai was having officials who were in his faction often spread news about Li Tai's abilities, trying to create an impression among the people that Li Tai should be crown prince. Li Chengqian was becoming increasingly insecure, and he began to discuss within his own faction what to do. His closest allies included his uncle Li Yuanchang (李元昌) the Prince of Han, the imperial guard commander Li Anyan (李安儼), his cousin Zhao Jie (趙節), and Du Ruhui's son and his brother-in-law Du He (杜荷). Eventually, he also invited the major general Hou Junji, whose son-in-law Helan Chushi (賀蘭楚石) was Li Chengqian's guard commander, into the plot, and considered overthrowing Emperor Taizong.

In spring 643, however, Li Chengqian's younger brother Li You (李祐) the Prince of Qi, resentful of the head of his household, Quan Wanji (權萬紀), killed Quan and then rebelled. Li You was soon defeated and captured, and when Emperor Taizong investigated Li You's co-conspirators, Gegan Chengji was arrested and sentenced to death. Gegan, in order to save himself, revealed the plot. Emperor Taizong, in shock, convened the senior officials Zhangsun Wuji (Empress Zhangsun's brother), Fang Xuanling, Xiao Yu, and Li Shiji, as well as officials from the supreme court, the legislative bureau, and the examination bureau, to investigate, and the extent of the plot was revealed. When Emperor Taizong requested opinions on what to do with Li Chengqian, Lai Ji suggested sparing him, and Emperor Taizong agreed. On 29 April, he deposed Li Chengqian and reduced him to commoner rank, while ordering Li Yuanchang to commit suicide. Hou and the other conspirators were all executed.

Emperor Taizong initially told Li Tai that he would be created crown prince, but soon came to believe that Li Tai's machinations were responsible for Li Chengqian's downfall. When Emperor Taizong himself visited Li Chengqian, Li Chengqian told him:

I was already crown prince, and what else could I be looking for. It is because Li Tai often conspired against me, and I had to therefore discuss with my staff how to save myself. Those overly ambitious people thus suggested that I commit treason. If you create Li Tai crown prince, you are falling into his trap.

Emperor Taizong agreed, and as Zhangsun Wuji proposed creating another son by Empress Zhangsun, Li Zhi the Prince of Jin, crown prince, Emperor Taizong did so, putting Li Tai under house arrest as well and reducing his title, although keeping the title a princely title. In fall 643, Emperor Taizong exiled both Li Chengqian and Li Tai—in the case of Li Chengqian, to Qian Prefecture (黔州, modern southeastern Chongqing).

Around the new year 645, Li Chengqian died at Cheng Prefecture. Emperor Taizong ordered that he be buried with the honors due a duke. After Li Chengqian's grandson Li Shizhi became chancellor during the reign of Li Chengqian's grandnephew Emperor Xuanzong, he often spoke to Emperor Xuanzong in defense of his grandfather. On 6 October 736, Emperor Xuanzong posthumously honored Li Chengqian the Prince of Hengshan—a title that he previously held—and gave him the posthumous name of Min (愍, meaning "suffering"). On 20 Jun 738, he was buried at his father's mausoleum, Zhao Mausoleum.

== See also ==
- Turks in the Tang military

== Bibliography ==
- The Cambridge History of Chinese Literature, vol. 1, Cambridge University Press, 2010
- Charles Patrick Fitzgerald (June 1971), Son of heaven: a biography of Li Shih-Min, founder of the Tʻang dynasty, AMS Press, ISBN 978-0-404-02404-8
