= Duan Zhixuan =

Tang dynasty general

Duan Xiong
- 段雄
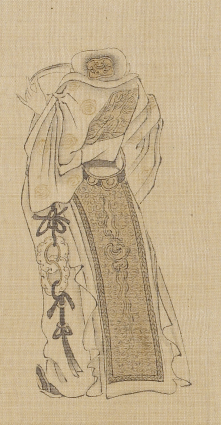

Consultant of Imperial Kitchen (光禄大夫)
- In office 617–626
- Monarch: Emperor Gaozu of Tang

Grand (Senior) General of Left Brave Guard (左骁卫大将军)
- In office 627–637
- Monarch: Emperor Taizong of Tang

Prefectural Governor of Jinzhou (金州刺史）
- In office 637–638
- Monarch: Emperor Taizong of Tang

Grand (Senior) General of Right Guard (右卫大将军)
- In office 638–640
- Monarch: Emperor Gaozu of Tang

Zhenjun Grand General (镇军大将军)
- In office 640–642
- Monarch: Emperor Taizong of Tang

Personal details
- Born: 598; Zouping
- Died: Between 22 February and 15 November 642; Chang'an
- Children: Duan Zan (son); Duan Guan (son); Duan Gui (son)
- Parent: Duan Yanshi (father)
- Occupation: General, Official
- Courtesy name: Zhixuan (志玄)
- Title: Duke of Bao (褒国公)
- Posthumous name: Zhongzhuang (忠壮)

Duan Xiong (Chinese: 段雄), titled Duke Zhongzhuang of Bao, better known by his courtesy name as Duan Zhixuan (Chinese: 段志玄), was a general and officer of the early Tang dynasty. He is one of 24 honored founding officials of the Tang dynasty at Lingyan Pavilion.

== In history ==
Duan Zhixuan was the son of Duan Yanshi, a mid-low ranked officer of Taiyuan during the Sui dynasty, and a friend to Li Yuan, the founding emperor of the Tang dynasty. Duan Zhixuan and his father joined the rebellion led by Li Yuan that eventually overthrew the Sui dynasty in 617–618. During the rebellion, Duan Zhixuan, Chai Shao and Liu Wenjing defeated and captured the Sui generals Sang Xianhe and Qutu Tong in a battle near Tong Pass. Duan was rewarded the title Marquis of Linji after this battle. Later, he became a subordinate to Li Shimin and took part in unification wars against various warlords including Xue Ju, Liu Wuzhou and Wang Shichong. In 626, he was a key figure that helped Li Shimin obtain the crown in the Xuanwu Gate Incident. When Li Shimin became the emperor (Emperor Taizong of Tang), Duan Zhixuan was rewarded the title Duke of Fan and appointed to be the Grand General of Left Brave Guard. During the reign of Emperor Taizong, Duan Zhixuan served in different positions both in the military and in local government. He also took part in the early stage of the campaign against Tuyuhun in 634. In 637, his title changed to Duke of Bao, and his descendants were given the privilege to inherit his title. He died in 642 and was given a posthumous name Zhongzhuang (Chinese: 忠壮; lit. 'loyal and heroic').

== In popular culture ==
In Chinese folklores and some classic novels, Duan Zhixuan is often mistakenly referred to as Duan Zhiyuan (Chinese: 段志远) or Duan Zhixian (Chinese: 段志贤). In those folk stories, Duan Zhixuan is one of four close guards (along with Ma Sanbao, Liu Hongji and Yin Kaishan) protecting Li Shimin. He was killed by the Korean general Yŏn Kaesomun during a war between Tang and Goguryeo.

== Family ==
- Grandfather: Duan Yuan, the County Mayor of Pingling during the Northern Qi dynasty.
- Father: Duan Yanshi, the secretary of law in Taiyuan Prefecture during the Sui dynasty; rewarded Duke of Yidu County during the Tang dynasty.
- Elder brother: Duan Zhihe (Duan Hui), served in local military divisions during the Tang dynasty, Baron of Quwo County.
- Younger Brother: Duan Zhigan, a junior general in the Left Guard during the Tang dynasty.
- Son: Duan Zan, Grand (Senior) General of Left Station Guard during the reign of Wu Zetian.
  - Grandson: Duan Huaijian, Taizi Zhanshi (officer for crowned prince affairs) in the reign of Emperor Xuanzong.
  - Grandson: Duan Huaigu
  - Guandson: Duan Huaiyi, Prefectural Governor of Fangzhou.
- Son: Duan Guan, an assistant managing imperial seals.
  - Grandson: Duan Huaixu, a mid-low ranked officer in Dezhou.
    - Great Grandson: Duan Chengzong (686—753), Vice Prefectural Governor of Jinling,
      - 4th Generation Grandson: Duan Xian
  - Grandson: Duan Huajiao.
    - Great-grandson: Duan E.
      - 4th Generation Grandson: Duan Wenchang, Duke of Zouping, served as chancellor during the reign of Emperor Muzong
        - 5th Generation Grandson: Duan Chengshi, poet and writer, the author of Ye Xian.
  - Grandson: Duan Huaiyan.
- Son：Duan Gui
  - Grandson: Duan Huaiben, Prefectural Governor of Suzhou.
