= Notable Xianbei people =

This is a list of notable Xianbei people.

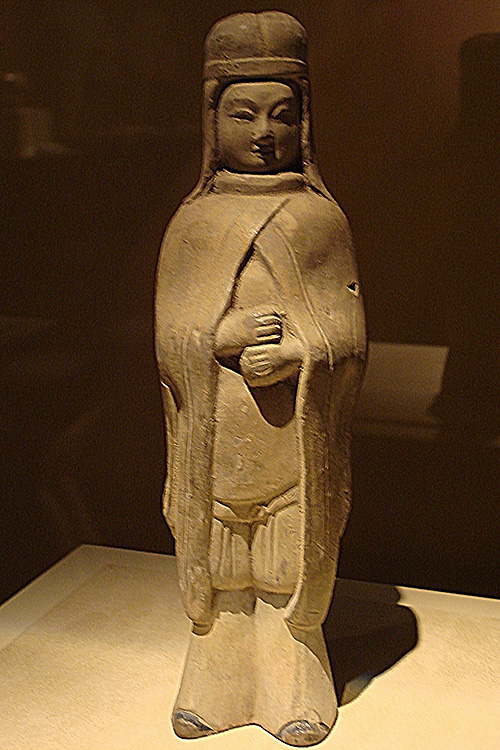
Female Xianbei figure

== Pre-dynastic ==
- Tanshihuai (檀石槐, 136–181), Xianbei leader who led the Xianbei confederation
- Kebineng (軻比能, died 235), Xianbei chieftain who lived during the late Eastern Han dynasty and Three Kingdoms period
- Tufa Shujineng (禿髮樹機能, died 279), Xianbei chieftain who lived during the Three Kingdoms period

== Sixteen Kingdoms ==
=== Yan and Tuyuhun ===
- Murong Hui (慕容廆, 269–333), chieftain of the Murong tribe and Duke of Liaodong
- Murong Tuyuhun (慕容吐谷渾, 246–317), founder of the Tuyuhun
- Murong Huang (慕容皝, 297–348), founder of the Former Yan
- Murong Chui (慕容垂, 326–396), a general of the Former Yan and founder of the Later Yan
- Murong Ke (慕容恪, died 367), a general and statesman of the Former Yan
- Murong Chong (慕容沖, 359–386) second ruler of the Western Yan
- Murong De (慕容德, 336–405), founder of the Southern Yan

=== Dai ===
- Tuoba Yilu (拓跋猗盧, died 316), founder of the Tuoba Dai
- Tuoba Shiyiqian (拓跋什翼犍, 320–376), last ruler of the Tuoba Dai

=== Southern Liang ===
- Tufa Wugu (禿髮烏孤, died 399), founder of the Southern Liang
- Tufa Rutan (禿髮傉檀, 365–415), last ruler of the Southern Liang

=== Western Qin ===
- Qifu Gangui (乞伏乾歸, died 412), second ruler of the Western Qin
- Qifu Chipan (乞伏熾磐, died 428), third ruler of the Western Qin

== Northern dynasties ==
- Tuoba Gui (拓跋珪, 371–409), founding emperor of the Northern Wei
- Tuoba Tao (拓跋燾, 408–452), third emperor of the Northern Wei
- Tufa Poqiang (禿髮破羌, 407–479), a paramount general of the Northern Wei
- Yuwen Tai (宇文泰, 507–556), a paramount general of the state Western Wei, a branch successor state of Northern Wei
- Dugu Xin (独孤信, 503–557), a paramount general of the state Western Wei
- Yuchi Jiong (尉遲迥, died 580), a paramount general of the states Western Wei and Northern Zhou
- Lou Zhaojun (婁昭君, 501–562), an empress dowager of the state Northern Qi
- Lu Lingxuan (陸令萱, died 577), a lady in waiting in the palace of the state Northern Qi
- Yuwen Hu (宇文護, 513–572), a regent of the state Northern Zhou
- Emperor Xiaojing of Eastern Wei (魏孝靜帝, 524-550) founder and only emperor of the state Eastern Wei
- Mu Tipo (穆提婆, 527–577), a paramount official of the state Northern Qi
- Mu Yeli (穆邪利, 557–577), an empress of the state Northern Qi
- Gao Anagong (高阿那肱, died 580), a paramount official and general of the state Northern Qi
- Queen Dugu (獨孤王后, 536–558), a queen of the state Northern Zhou
- Yuwen Yong (宇文邕, 543–578), emperor of the state Northern Zhou

== Sui dynasty ==
- Dugu Qieluo (獨孤伽羅, 544–602), formally Empress Wenxian (文獻皇后), an empress of the Sui dynasty
- Yuchi Yichen (尉遲義臣, died 617), a prominent general of the Sui dynasty
- Yuwen Shu (宇文述, died 616), a paramount general of the Sui dynasty
- Yuwen Huaji (宇文化及, 569–619), a paramount general of the Sui dynasty
- Yuwen Zhiji (宇文智及, 572–619), a general of the Sui dynasty

== Tang dynasty ==
- Empress Zhangsun (長孫皇后, 601–636), an empress of the Tang dynasty. She was the wife of Emperor Taizong
- Zhangsun Wuji (長孫無忌, died 659), a paramount official who served both as general and chancellor in the early Tang dynasty
- Yuchi Jingde (尉遲敬德, 585–658), a famous general who lived in the early Tang dynasty, Yuchi Jingde and another general Qin Shubao are worshipped as door gods in Chinese folk religion
- Qutu Tong (屈突通, 557–628), a general in the Sui and Tang dynasties of China. He was listed as one of 24 founding officials of the Tang dynasty honored on the Lingyan Pavilion due to his contributions in wars during the transitional period from Sui to Tang
- Zhangsun Shunde (長孫顺德, ?–?), a general in the early Tang dynasty
- Yuwen Shiji (宇文士及, died 642), an official who served both as general and chancellor in the early Tang dynasty
- Yu Zhining (于志寧, 588–665), a chancellor of the Tang dynasty, during the reigns of Emperor Taizong and Emperor Gaozong
- Dou Dexuan (竇德玄, 598–666), a chancellor of the Tang dynasty, during the reign of Emperor Gaozong
- Yuwen Jie (宇文節, ?–?), a chancellor of the Tang dynasty, during the reign of Emperor Gaozong
- Lou Shide (婁師德, 630–699), a scholar-general of the Tang dynasty, during the reign of Wu Zetian
- Doulu Qinwang (豆盧欽望, 624–709), a chancellor of the Tang dynasty, during the reign of Wu Zetian
- Dou Huaizhen (竇懷貞, died 713), a chancellor of the Tang dynasty, during the reign of Emperor Xuanzong
- Yuwen Rong (宇文融, died 731), a chancellor of the Tang dynasty, during the reign of Emperor Xuanzong
- Yuan Qianyao (源乾曜, died 731), a chancellor of the Tang dynasty, during the reign of Emperor Xuanzong
- Yu Di (于頔, died 818), a general and official of the Tang dynasty
- Tutu Chengcui (吐突承璀, died 820), a paramount eunuch official of the middle Tang dynasty
- Yuan Zhen (元稹, 779–831), a poet and politician of the middle Tang dynasty
- Yu Cong (于琮, died 881), a chancellor of the late Tang dynasty, during the reign of Emperor Yizong
- Doulu Zhuan (豆盧瑑, died 881), a chancellor of the late Tang dynasty, during the reign of Emperor Xizong
