= Liu Hongji =

- 刘弘基
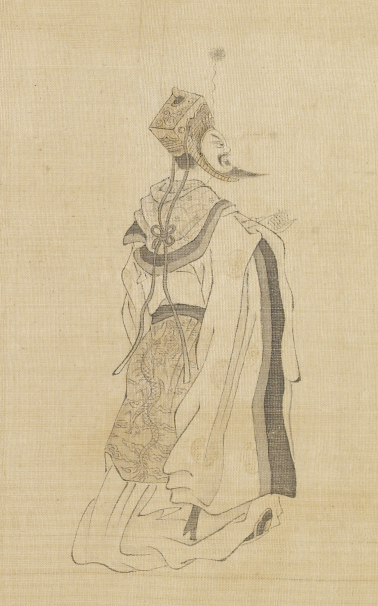

Left Vice Captain of Grand General's Office (大将军府左统军)
- In office 617–617
- Monarch: Li Yuan

Right Consultant of Imperial Kitchen (右光禄大夫)
- In office 617 – 617
- Monarch: Li Yuan

Right Army Commander (右领都督)
- In office 617 – 618
- Monarch: Emperor Gaozu of Tang

Grand (Senior) General of Right Brave Guard (右骁卫大将军)
- In office 618 – 627
- Monarchs: Emperor Gaozu of Tang, then Emperor Taizong of Tang

Prefectural Governor of Yizhou (易州刺史)
- In office 629 – 635
- Monarch: Emperor Taizong of Tang

Prefectural Governor of Langzhou (朗州刺史)
- In office 635 – 645
- Monarch: Emperor Taizong of Tang

Senior Commander of Vanguard Force (前军大总管)
- In office 645 – 645
- Monarch: Emperor Taizong of Tang

Fuguo (Empire Assisting) Senior General (辅国大将军)
- In office 645 – 650
- Monarchs: Emperor Taizong of Tang, then Emperor Gaozong of Tang

Personal details
- Born: 582; Chiyang
- Died: 650; Chang'an
- Children: Liu Renshi (son); Liu Renjing (foster son)
- Parent: Liu Sheng (father)
- Occupation: General, Official
- Courtesy name: unknown
- Title: Duke of Kui (夔国公)
- Posthumous name: Xiang (襄)

Liu Hongji (Chinese: 刘弘基; 582 - 650), titled Duke Xiang of Kui, was a general and officer in the early Tang dynasty of China. He was listed as one of 24 honored founding officials of the Tang dynasty at Lingyan Pavilion.

== In history ==
Liu Hongji is son of Liu Sheng, a governor of Hezhou prefecture during the Sui dynasty. He was drafted to the military service during Emperor Yang of Sui's campaigns against Goguryeo, but he was late for the duty, which might lead to a death penalty. He thus intentionally killed a farmer's cow, which was a civil non-death felony. He was arrested for killing the cow by the local government and imprisoned, and avoided the death row. After being released after one year, he became a horse thief. Later, he met Li Shimin, the future Emperor Taizong of Tang, and became Li's close friend.

When Li Yuan (Li Shimin's father and future founding emperor of the Tang dynasty) decided to rebel against Sui in 617, Liu Hongji and Zhangsun Shunde ambushed and killed Wang Wei and Gao Junya, the two deputy officials of Taiyuan who helped Emperor Yang of Sui spy on Li Yuan, and made it possible for Li Yuan to rebel in Taiyuan. During the rebellion, Liu Hongji defeated Song Laosheng, the Sui general guarding the town of Huoyi. Later, he led his soldiers crossed the Yellow River and occupied the territory north of Wei River. His move cleared the flank for Li Yuan's main force who were attacking the Sui capital Daxing (on the southern bank of Wei River, better known as Chang'an) from the east. Then, he led his men captured Fufeng, a town west of Daxing, and finished the encirclement around Daxing. Wei Wensheng, the Sui general guarding the Daxing area, was defeated by Liu Hongji's force at the Jinguang Gate of Daxing city. After Li Yuan captured Daxing and formally established the Tang dynasty, Liu Hongji was honored for his outstanding contribution.

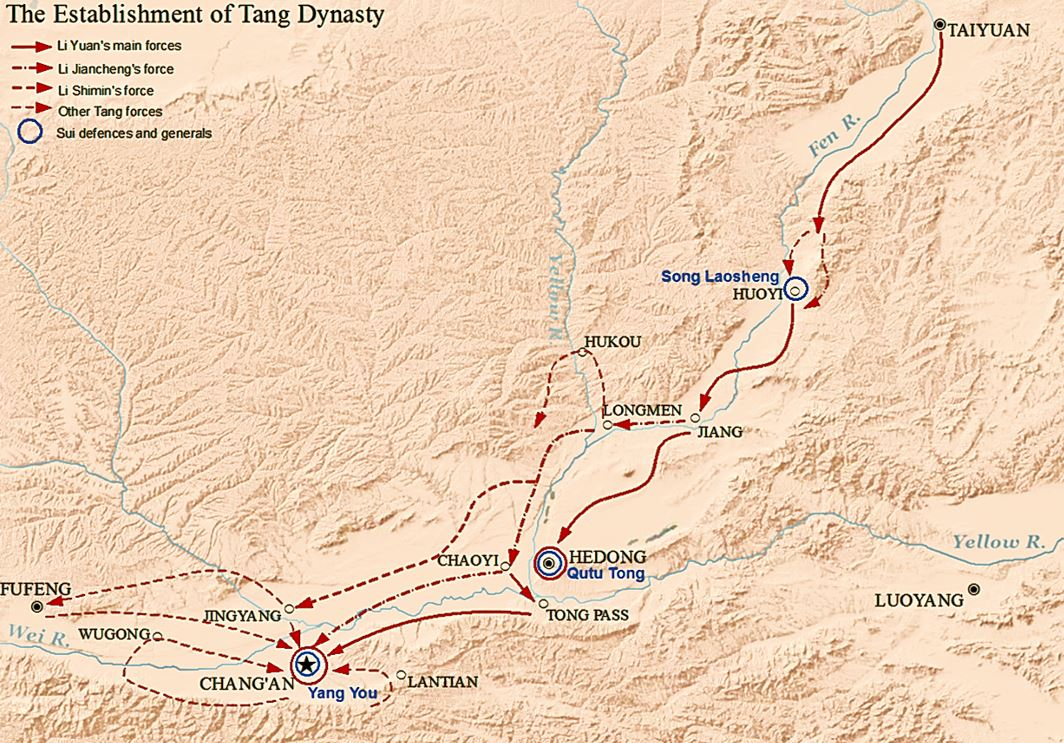
Li Yuan's rebellion. Liu Hongji's force is marked in dash as "other Tang forces"

From 618 to 622, Liu Hongji took part in Tang's unification wars against Xue Ju, Liu Wuzhou and Liu Heita as a subordinate to Li Shimin. He was titled Duke of Ren for his military achievements. In 624, the court sent Liu Hongji and Li Shentong (Prince of Huai'an) to Binzhou, a frontier town north of Chang'an, to guard the border between Tang and Tujue. He constructed a series of defending fortresses in today's Shaanxi and Gansu provinces. In 627, he was implicated by his friend Prince of Yi'an, Li Xiaochang, who tried to launch a riot against the newly crowned Li Shimin (Emperor Taizong) after the Xuanwu Gate Incident. Liu Hongji lost all his titles and positions. More than one year later, he was promoted again as the prefectural governor of Yizhou. In 635, he moved to Langzhou, also as a prefectural governor, and he was also promoted to Duke of Kui. In 645, he took part in the campaign against Goguryeo led by Emperor Taizong as the chief commander of the vanguard force. He died in 650, one year later than Emperor Taizong. Emperor Gaozong of Tang honored him titles of Chancellor and Grand Commander of Bingzhou.

== In popular culture ==
In folk stories, Liu Hongji was one of the four close guards (along with Yin Kaishan, Duan Zhixuan and Ma Sanbao) to protect Li Shimin when he was the Prince of Qin. During the campaign against Goguryeo, all four guards were killed by Yŏn Kaesomun in a battle.

== Family ==
Father:

- Liu Sheng: Prefectural governor of Hezhou in the Sui dynasty

Son:

- Liu Renshi: Division commander in Left Dianrong Guard, succeeded the title of Duke of Kui
- Liu Renjing: foster-son (originally nephew), officer in the Bureau of Agriculture
