= Empress Ju =

Empress Ju may refer to:

- Empress Ju (fl. 617), wife of Liu Wuzhou
- Empress Ju (fl. 617), wife of Xue Ju

== See also ==
- Queen Ju (fl. 4th century), wife of Micheon of Goguryeo
