= Yin Kaishan =

Yin Jiao
- 殷峤
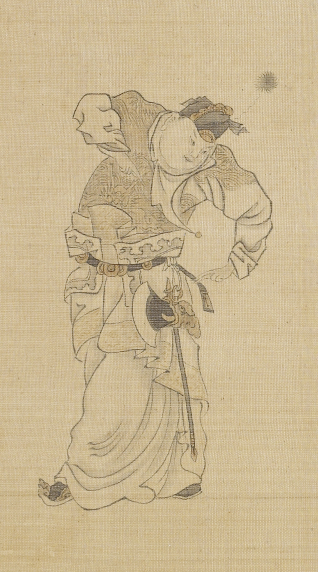

County magistrate of Taigu (太谷县令)
- In office ?–?
- Monarch: Emperor Yang of Sui

County magistrate of Shi'ai (石爱县令)
- In office ? – 617
- Monarch: Emperor Yang of Sui

Yuan (Assistant) in the Grand General Office (大将军府掾)
- In office 617 – c.618
- Monarch: Emperor Gaozu of Tang

Staff in Weibei Circuit General Office (渭北道行军长史)
- In office 617 – 617
- Monarch: Emperor Gaozu of Tang

Vice General of Weibei Circuit (渭北道副大使)
- In office 617 – 617
- Monarch: Emperor Gaozu of Tang

Vice Minister in the Ministry of Personnel (吏部侍郎)
- In office 617 – 618
- Monarch: Emperor Gaozu of Tang

Minister in the Ministry of Personnel (吏部尚书)
- In office 619 – 622
- Monarch: Emperor Gaozu of Tang

Personal details
- Born: Unknown; Huyi
- Died: 622; Hebei
- Children: None
- Parent: Yin Sengshou (father)
- Occupation: General, Official
- Courtesy name: Kaishan (开山)
- Title: Duke of Xun (勋国公)
- Posthumous name: Jie (节)

Yin Jiao (Chinese: 殷峤), better known by his courtesy name Kaishan (Chinese: 殷开山), titled Duke Jie of Xun, was a general and officer in Sui and Tang dynasties of China. Because of his remarkable contributions during the unification wars of Tang dynasty, Yin Kaishan was listed as one of 24 founding officials of the Tang dynasty honored on the Lingyan Pavilion.

== In history ==
Yin Kaishan became popular at a young age because of his outstanding skills in writing and calligraphy. He served as the county magistrate in Taigu and Shi'ai counties during the Sui dynasty. When Li Yuan, the later Emperor Gaozu of Tang, rebelled against Sui dynasty in Jinyang in 617, Yin Kaishan joined the rebellion force. Li Yuan appointed him to be the assistant in the grand general's office. Soon after that, Yin Kaishan took part in the Battle of Huoyi, the key battle that secured Li Yuan's success in establishing the Tang dynasty.

Yin Kaishan also took part in campaigns against Xue Ju, a warlord based in Jincheng, and Liu Wuzhou, a warlord based in northern Shanxi. During the battle against Xue Ju, Yin Kaishan was defeated because he underestimated the enemy and did not obey the order from Li Shimin, the chief general of Tang in this campaign. Yin was demoted after the battle due to his fault. However, in the next battle against Xue Ju's son Xue Renguo, Yin Kaishan made major contributions, so he was promoted back to his old position after the war. In the campaign against Liu Wuzhou, Yin Kaishan led a key force of Tang during the Battle of Meiliangchuan. Yin Kaishan assisted Qin Shubao in the battle and forced Yuchi Jingde, a top warrior serving for Liu Wuzhou, to surrender to Tang.

In 619, Yin Kaishan was appointed to be the minister in the Ministry of Personnel. Then, he joined the campaign led by Li Shimin against Wang Shichong and Dou Jiande, the two most powerful rivals of Tang dynasty at that time. After the Battle of Hulao, Tang dynasty captured both Wang and Dou. Yin Kaishan was given a title of Duke of Xun by Emperor Gaozu of Tang after the campaign to award his contributions.

In 622, Yin Kaishan died on the way to Hebei to fight against the rebel Liu Heita.

== In popular culture ==
In folk stories, Yin Kaishan was regarded as one of the four guards (the other three being Liu Hongji, Duan Zhixuan and Ma Sanbao) to protect Li Shimin when he was the Prince of Qin. During the campaign against Goguryeo, Yin Kaishan and the other three guards were killed by Yŏn Kaesomun in the battle at Fenghuang Mountain.

In the classic novel Journey to the West by Wu Cheng'en, the monk Xuanzang was said to be the son of Yin Wenjiao, who was Yin Kaishan's daughter.

== Family ==
Yin Kaishan is a descendant of the Yin clan from Chen Prefecture, which was one of the powerful clans during the Southern dynasties.

Great-great-grandfather:

- Yin Ren: A general under the Prince of Yuzhang during the Southern Qi dynasty

Great-grandfather:

- Yin Gaoming: An officer in the Ministry of Wars during the Liang dynasty

Grandfather:

- Yin Buhai: An officer of the Board of Agriculture during the Chen dynasty, also a famous artist

Granduncles:

- Yin Bu'ning: A high-ranked officer during the Liang and Chen dynasties
- Yin Buyi
- Yin Buzhan
- Yin Buqi

Father:

- Yin Sengshou: an imperial secretary of the Sui dynasty

Brother：

- Yin Qinzhou (586 - 7 November 645): epitaph was found

Son: Yin Kaishan did not have any sons. However, his nephew Yin Yuan was considered as his son after the formal adoption to succeed his title of nobility.
