= Pei Ji =

Pei Ji may refer to:

- Pei Ji (Sui and Tang) (570–629), Chinese official of the Sui and Tang dynasties
- Pei Ji (Late Tang) (died 811), Chinese official of the Tang Dynasty
