= Liu Wenjing =

Chinese politician

Liu Wenjing 劉文靜
- Born: 568; Wugong County, Shaanxi
- Died: 619 (aged 51); Xi'an, Shaanxi
- Other names: Zhaoren (肇仁); Duke of Lu (魯公)
- Occupation: Politician
- Children: Liu Shuyi (劉樹義); Liu Shuyi (劉樹藝)
- Father: Liu Shao

Liu Wenjing (劉文靜; 568 – 15 November 619?), courtesy name Zhaoren (肇仁), formally the Duke of Lu (魯公), was a Chinese politician during the Tang dynasty. He initially served as an official of the Sui dynasty and was one of the driving forces in persuading the general Li Yuan to rebel against Emperor Yang of Sui. He assisted Li Yuan in establishing the Tang dynasty and becoming its first ruler. After Li Yuan became the emperor, he did not award the same honours to Liu Wenjing as he did to Pei Ji, thus Liu became very resentful. He engaged sorcerers to help him seek divine favours, but was executed after Li Yuan found out about it.

== Background ==
According to Liu Wenjing himself, his ancestors were from Pengcheng (彭城, in modern Xuzhou, Jiangsu), but later moved to the Chang'an region. His grandfather Liu Yi (劉懿) was a provincial governor during Northern Zhou. His father Liu Shao (劉韶) served in the army of the succeeding Sui dynasty and died in battle. As a result of this and the posthumous honors that Liu Shao received, Liu Wenjing received a governmental rank, and late in the reign of Emperor Yang, he was the county magistrate at the important city of Jinyang (晉陽, in modern Taiyuan, Shanxi), where he became friendly with another official, Pei Ji, who was the head of the household at Emperor Yang's secondary palace at Jinyang.

== Participation in Li Yuan's rebellion ==
When the general Li Yuan the Duke of Tang was put in charge of Taiyuan (i.e., Jinyang) in 616, Liu saw that Li Yuan had great ambitions and therefore befriended him, but was even more impressed with Li Yuan's son Li Shimin, privately comparing Li Shimin to Emperor Gao of Han and Cao Cao when talking with Pei. In 617, when Li Mi rose in open rebellion near the eastern capital Luoyang, claiming the title of Duke of Wei, Liu, who was related to Li Mi by marriage, was briefly arrested and jailed on Emperor Yang's orders. When Li Shimin visited him in jail, he pointed out to Li Shimin the disturbed state that Sui was in and encouraged him to consider rebellion. Li Shimin agreed and began to plan for rebellion, but was initially hesitant to inform Li Yuan. As Li Yuan trusted Pei greatly, Liu devised the plot of having his associate Gao Binlian (高斌廉) gamble with Pei and intentionally lose to him, gradually endearing himself to Pei, and then inform him of the plot. Liu also personally persuaded Pei, pointing out to him that Pei, who had earlier permitted Li Yuan to have sexual relations with ladies in waiting at the Jinyang Palace, was violating serious regulations, and that in any case, Emperor Yang was already suspicious of Li Yuan because there had been prophecies that the next emperor would be named Li. Pei agreed, and he persuaded Li Yuan of the wisdom of rebelling. Li Yuan then had Liu forge an edict from Emperor Yang stating that all men in the surrounding commanderies from age 20 to 50 were all to be conscripted for a campaign against Goguryeo—against which Emperor Yang had earlier launched three largely disastrous campaigns—to arouse the despair of the people in the commanderies.

As Li Yuan prepared rebellion in spring 617, his deputies Wang Wei (王威) and Gao Junya (高君雅) began to be suspicious of him. Liu devised a plot where he entered the hall where Li Yuan, Wang, and Gao were sitting with his associate Liu Zhenghui (劉政會) and had Liu Zhenghui falsely accuse Wang and Gao of collaborating with Eastern Tujue. Li Yuan, feigning surprise, had Wang and Gao arrested. When Eastern Tujue soon attacked, the people believed the accusation that Wang and Gao were collaborating with Eastern Tujue, and Li Yuan used this excuse to execute them.

Li Yuan declared rebellion in fall 617, and Liu Wenjing suggested that he, who was still ostensibly claiming to be loyal to Sui but wanting to support Emperor Yang's grandson Yang You the Prince of Dai, then at Chang'an, as emperor, should change his banners from the regular Sui banners to distance himself from Emperor Yang, while seeking an alliance with Eastern Tujue for support. Li Yuan agreed, and sent Liu to Eastern Tujue to meet with the Shibi Khan Ashina Duojishi. When Ashina Duojishi asked him what Li Yuan's intention was, Liu responded:

The emperor [i.e., Emperor Yang's father Emperor Wen] deposed his proper heir [i.e., Emperor Yang's older brother Yang Yong] and gave the throne to this current emperor, and this led to the current troubles. The Duke of Tang is an honored relative of the imperial clan, and he did not dare to sit by watching for the state to fail, and therefore he rose in righteousness, wanting to depose the improper emperor. He is willing to enter the capital with the soldiers of you, Great Khan. If you do so, the people and the land will belong to the Duke of Tang, but the money, silk, gold, and treasures will be yours, Great Khan.

Ashina Duojishi was pleased, and while he was not wholeheartedly willing to support Li Yuan, he nevertheless sent his general Kangqiaoli (康鞘利) with 2,000 men to accompany Liu back south, as Li Yuan had already marched south toward Chang'an, and he also gave Li Yuan 1,000 horses. Li Yuan, who wanted Tujue horses more than Tujue soldiers, was pleased and praised Liu for his skills at diplomacy. Subsequently, after Li Yuan decided to bypass Hedong (河東, in modern Yuncheng, Shanxi) and directly cross the Yellow River and attack Chang'an, he sent Liu with his son Li Jiancheng to Tong Pass to defend against an attack from Qutu Tong (屈突通), the Sui general defending Hedong. Qutu did indeed attack to try to prevent Li Yuan's advance, and while Liu initially suffered losses against Qutu's subordinate Sang Xianhe (桑顯和), he was ultimately able to defeat Sang and further capture Qutu. Once Li Yuan captured Chang'an in winter 617 and declared Yang You emperor (as Emperor Gong) but retained power as regent, Liu was created the Duke of Lu.

== During Emperor Gaozu's reign ==
In spring 618, Emperor Yang was killed in a coup at Jiangdu (江都, in modern Yangzhou, Jiangsu) led by the general Yuwen Huaji. When the news arrived at Chang'an, Li Yuan had Yang You yield the throne to him, establishing Tang dynasty as its Emperor Gaozu. He made Liu Wenjing Nayan (納言), the head of the examination bureau of the government, considered one of the posts for a chancellor. He also had Liu and Pei Ji revised the Sui laws, although he rejected Liu's suggestion to distance himself a bit more from his officials in order to show authority, opting often to dine with his officials at the same table.

Meanwhile, the newly established Tang was under threat from another rebel ruler, Xue Ju the Emperor of Qin. Emperor Gaozu sent Li Shimin against Xue, with Liu and Yin Kaishan (殷開山) as his deputies. On the way, however, Li Shimin became ill, and he transferred the command to Liu, while instructing Liu not to directly engage Xue but to wear him out. Instead, Liu, confident that he had a larger army than Xue, listened to Yin, who believed that Xue should be engaged. Xue, however, defeated him at Qianshui Plain (淺水原, in modern Xianyang, Shaanxi), killing some 50% to 60% of Tang soldiers. Li Shimin was forced to withdraw back to Chang'an, and Liu and Yin were removed from their posts. Later that year, however, after Xue Ju's death, Liu participated in Li Shimin's campaign that defeated Xue Ju's son and successor Xue Rengao, and his title was restored, but he was not again made a chancellor, but only as Li Shimin's assistant.

== Death and aftermath ==
Meanwhile, while Liu Wenjing and Pei Ji were initially friends, by this point they had developed an enmity, as Liu believed that he had greater contributions to Tang's establishment, and yet was not as trusted or honored as Pei. They had many disagreements, and each time they disagreed, Liu would insult Pei, and their friendship was broken. At one point, Liu Wenjing was so angry at Pei that, after he drank with his younger brother Liu Wenqi (劉文起), he drew his sword and hit a pillar with it, proclaiming, "One day, I will cut off Pei Ji's head!"

Meanwhile, there were unusual bad omens happening in the Liu household, and Liu Wenqi (劉文起) engaged witches to try to dispel the evil spirits. One of Liu Wenjing's concubines, who had lost favor, had her brother report this to Emperor Gaozu. Emperor Gaozu arrested Liu Wenjing and had Pei and Xiao Yu interrogate him. Liu Wenjing stated:

When we rose at Taiyuan, I was the military attache, roughly carrying the same rank as the secretary [i.e., Pei]. Now Pei is Puye [(僕射, i.e., the deputy head of the executive bureau and a chancellor)] and has a luxurious home, but my rank and bestowments were no greater than anyone else's. I have to march east and west, leaving my mother at the capital without even a place to hide herself from the weather. Of course I am disappointed, and I spoke only in frustration after I drank.

Emperor Gaozu was displeased and believed that Liu Wenjing was planning treason. Li Gang (李綱) and Xiao both spoke on Liu's behalf, as did Li Shimin, but Pei warned Emperor Gaozu that Liu was talented but reckless and might cause trouble in the future. Emperor Gaozu, who trusted Pei, hesitated but eventually agreed, and he executed both Liu Wenjing and Liu Wenqi and confiscated their wealth.

After Li Shimin became emperor in September 626 (as Emperor Taizong), he restored Liu Wenjing's titles posthumously in 629 and allowed his son Liu Shuyi (劉樹義) to inherit the title of Duke of Lu, promising to eventually give him a princess as his wife. However, Liu Shuyi was still resentful over his father's execution, and he plotted a rebellion with his brother Liu Shuyi (劉樹藝, note different character). The plot was discovered, and they were executed.
