= Zhang Gongjin =

- 张公谨
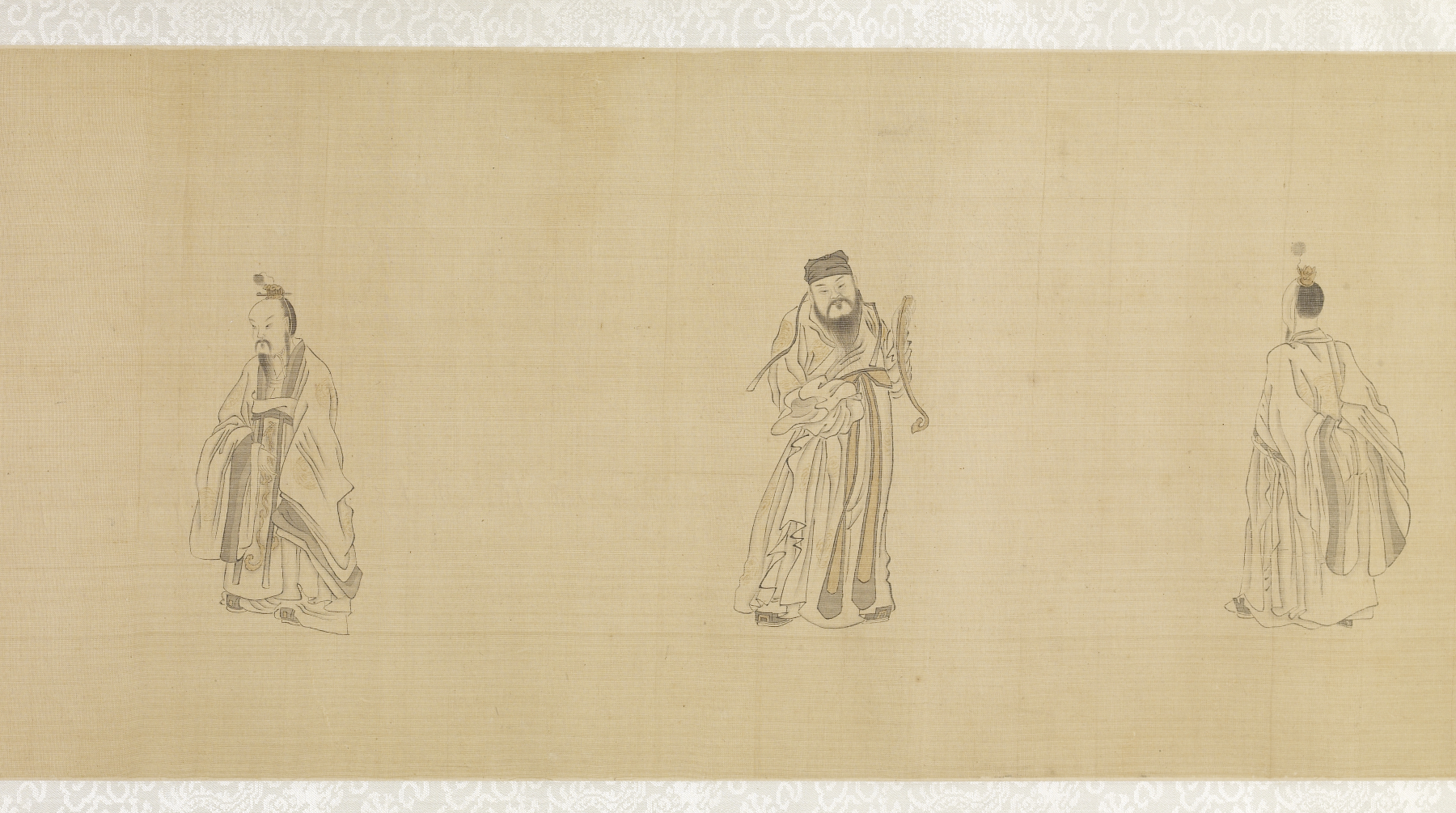
- The portrayal of Zhang Gongjin (middle) on the Lingyan Pavilion

Secretary of Weizhou (洧州长史)
- In office c. 617 – 618
- Monarch: Wang Shichong

Vice governor of Zouzhou (邹州别驾)
- In office 618 – 626
- Monarch: Li Yuan

Military Commander of Daizhou (代州都督)
- In office 627 – 630
- Monarch: Li Shimin

Military Commander of Xiangzhou (襄州都督)
- In office 630 – 632
- Monarch: Li Shimin

Personal details
- Born: 594; Weizhou
- Died: May 632; Xiangzhou
- Children: Zhang Daxiang; Zhang Dasu; Zhang Da'an
- Parent: Zhang Shiru (father)
- Occupation: Grand General of Left Xiao Guard Army
- Courtesy name: Hongshen (弘慎)
- Title: Duke of Tan (郯国公)

Zhang Gongjin (594 – 632), courtesy name Hongshen, titled Duke of Tan, was an official and general during the Tang dynasty of China. He played an important role in the Xuanwu Gate Incident in 626 which helped Emperor Taizong obtained the crown. He was a key general of Tang dynasty during the campaign against Illig Qaghan of Tujue. Because of his contributions, he was listed as one of 24 founding officials of Tang dynasty honored on the Lingyan Pavilion.

== In history ==
Zhang Gongjin was originally a low-ranked official under the warlord Wang Shichong. In 618, Zhang submitted to Tang dynasty and became a follower of Li Shimin, the then Prince of Qin, who was in a rivalry against the crowned prince Li Jiancheng for the potential chance of becoming the next emperor. In 626, Li Shimin ambushed and killed Li Jiancheng at Xuanwu Gate. During this incident, Zhang Gongjin played a big role in stopping Li Jiancheng's reinforcement forces led by Feng Li, Xue Wanche and Xie Shufang from breaking through the Xuanwu Gate. Li Shimin soon became the new emperor (Emperor Taizong) after the incident.

During Emperor Taizong's reign, Zhang Gongjin was a military commander guarding Daizhou, an important city in the north of Tang empire. He managed to keep Daizhou safe during invasions of Tujue people. In 629, the steppe in the north, home of Tujue tribes, suffered from a serious winter storm. Zhang Gongjin thus suggested to launch a counterattack against Tujue. He listed five reasons why Tang should launch this attack. Emperor Taizong took his advice and sent out six troops, all under Li Jing's command, to attack Tujue. Zhang Gongjin was the vice chief commander under Li Jing during this campaign. The Illig Qaghan was captured by Tang dynasty in the following year, which marked the collapse of the Eastern Turkic Khanate. Because of his contributions in this campaign, Zhang was given the title Duke of Zou. He was then appointed to be the military commander of Xiangzhou. During his time in Xiangzhou, he gained reputation as a good governor.

Zhang Gongjin died in Xiangzhou in 632. In 639, Emperor Taizong promoted his title to be Duke of Tan. In 643, he was listed on the Lingyan Pavilion.

== In folk legends ==
In folk legends, Zhang Gongjin was a low-ranked officer under Luo Yi, the general guarding Youzhou in Sui dynasty. Later, he joined the peasant uprising and became a leader of Wagang Army. After Wagang Army disbanded, Zhang Gongjin submitted to Tang dynasty and became a general. During the war against Goguryeo, Zhang Gongjin was killed by the Korean general Yŏn Kaesomun in the battle.

== Family ==
Grandfather:

- Zhang Ganzhi: A mid-ranked governor in Northern Qi dynasty

Father:

- Zhang Shiru: Duke of Dingyuan County (retroactively recognized by Tang dynasty)

Sons:

- Zhang Daxiang: Vice minister of Ministry of Revenue
- Zhang Dasu: A local governor of Huaizhou, and a historian
- Zhang Da'an: Chancellor during Emperor Gaozong's reign
- Zhang Daya: Died at a young age

Daughter:

- Zhang Wuliang

Grandsons:

- Zhang Chen: A county-level governor in Shandong
- Zhang Fei: A teaching staff at Imperial Academy
- Zhang Xu: A low-ranked local governor in Dingzhou
- Zhang Xuan: A mid-ranked officer in the central court during Wu Zetian's reign
- Zhang Qia: General of Left Jinwu Guard Army
- Zhang Shui: A top scholar at Imperial Academy
- Zhang Jun: A mid-ranked officer

Notable Great-Grandsons:

- Zhang Hui: A prefecture-level governor
- Yi Xing (Zhang Sui): One of best-known Buddhists, scientists and mathematicians in ancient China.
