= Lingyan Pavilion =

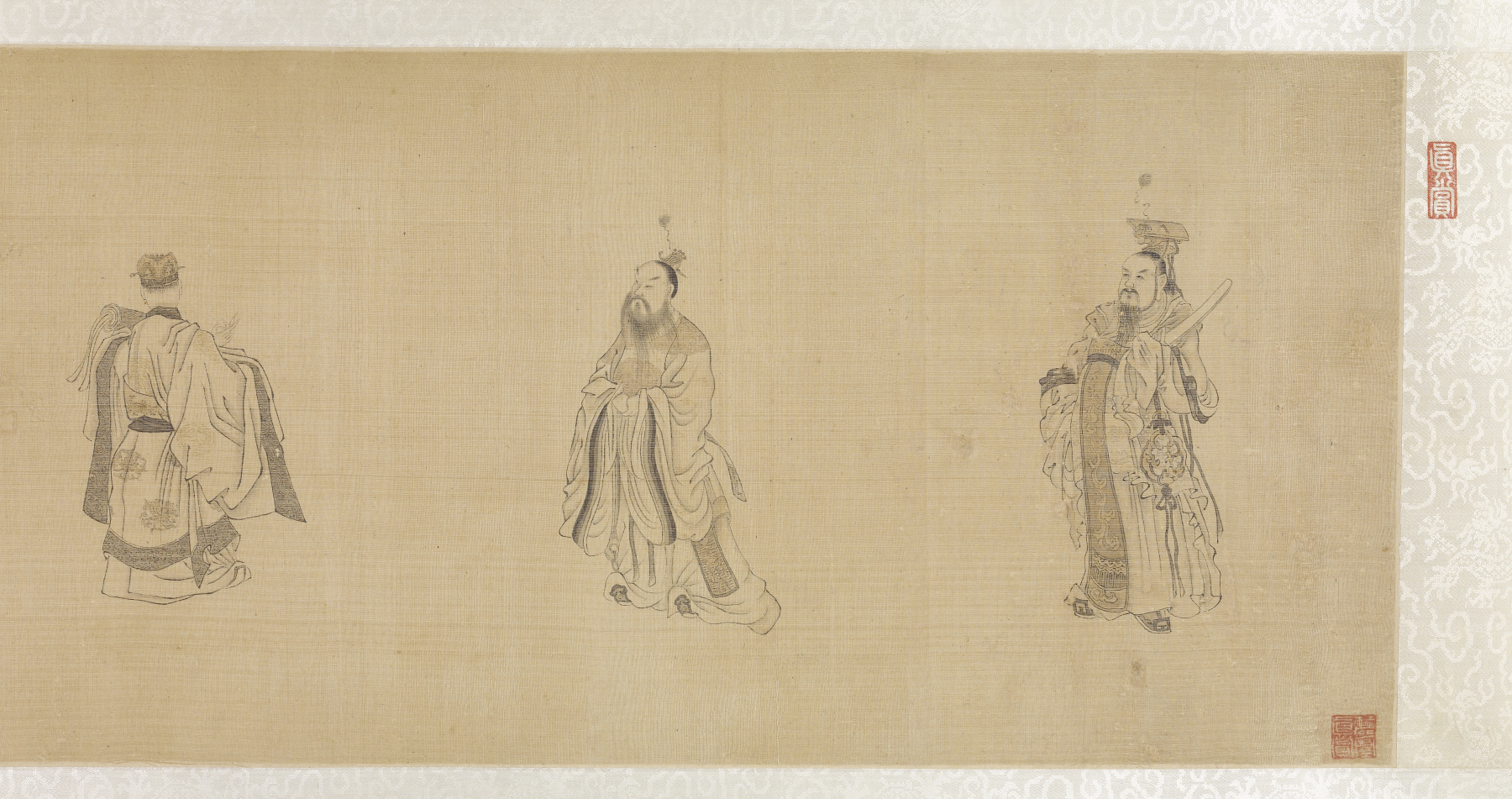
Three ministers; 17th-century paintings, copies of book illustrations, probably imaginary versions of the lost originals.

Lingyan Pavilion (simplified Chinese: 凌烟阁; traditional Chinese: 凌煙閣; pinyin: Língyān Gé) was a small tower beside Sanqing Hall (三清殿) in the southwest of Taiji Palace (太極宮), Chang'an, the capital of the Tang dynasty. Its location in modern China is roughly in the north of Xi'an, Shaanxi.

== The original 24 ==
On 23 March 643, during the Zhenguan era of the reign of Emperor Taizong in the Tang dynasty, the emperor commissioned the artist Yan Liben to paint life-sized portraits of 24 officials to commemorate them for their meritorious service and contributions aiding him in his establishment of the Tang Empire. However, many among the 24 men were also instrumental in helping Taizong seize power during the Xuanwu Gate Incident.

The paintings were displayed in Lingyan Pavilion and all of them faced north. The pavilion was divided into three layers: the innermost held the portraits of chancellors; the middle displayed paintings of princes and dukes; the outermost for the remaining ones. Emperor Taizong often visited the pavilion to view the portraits and reminisce the past.

The 24 officials are listed as such:

Name	Name in Chinese	Courtesy name	Courtesy name in Chinese	Title of Nobility	Occupation	Born	Died
Zhangsun Wuji	长孙无忌	Fuji	辅机	Duke of Zhao	Chancellor	594	659
Li Xiaogong	李孝恭	unknown		Prince of Hejian Prefecture	General	591	640
Du Ruhui	杜如晦	Keming	克明	Duke of Lai	Chancellor	585	630
Wei Zheng	魏征	Xuancheng	玄成	Duke of Zheng	Chancellor	580	643
Fang Qiao	房峤	Xuanling	玄龄	Duke of Liang	Chancellor	579	648
Gao Jian	高俭	Shilian	士廉	Duke of Shen	Chancellor	575	647
Yuchi Gong	尉迟恭	Jingde	敬德	Duke of E	General	585	658
Li Jing	李靖	Yaoshi	药师	Duke of Wey	General	571	649
Xiao Yu	萧瑀	Shiwen	时文	Duke of Song	Chancellor	574	647
Duan Xiong	段雄	Zhixuan	志玄	Duke of Bao	General	598	642
Liu Hongji	刘弘基	unknown		Duke of Kui	General	582	650
Qutu Tong	屈突通	unknown		Duke of Jiang	General	557	628
Yin Jiao	殷峤	Kaishan	开山	Duke Jie of Xun	General	?	622
Chai Shao	柴绍	Sichang	嗣昌	Duke of Huo	General	588	638
Zhangsun Shunde	长孙顺德	unknown		Duke of Pi	General	565	631
Zhang Liang	张亮	unknown		Duke of Xun	General	?	646
Hou Junji	侯君集	unknown		Duke of Chen	General	?	643
Zhang Gongjin	张公瑾	Hongshen	宏慎	Duke of Tan	General	594	632
Cheng Zhijie (Cheng Yaojin)	程知节 (程咬金)	Yizhen	义贞	Duke of Lu	General	589	665
Yu Shinan	虞世南	Boshi	伯施	Duke of Yongxing County	Chancellor	558	638
Liu Zhenghui	刘政会	unknown		Duke of Xing	Chancellor	?	635
Tang Jian	唐俭	Maoyue	茂约	Duke of Ju	Chancellor	579	656
Li Shiji (Xu Shiji)	李世勣 (徐世勣)	Maogong	懋功	Duke of Ying	General	594	669
Qin Qiong	秦琼	Shubao	叔宝	Duke of Hu	General	571	638

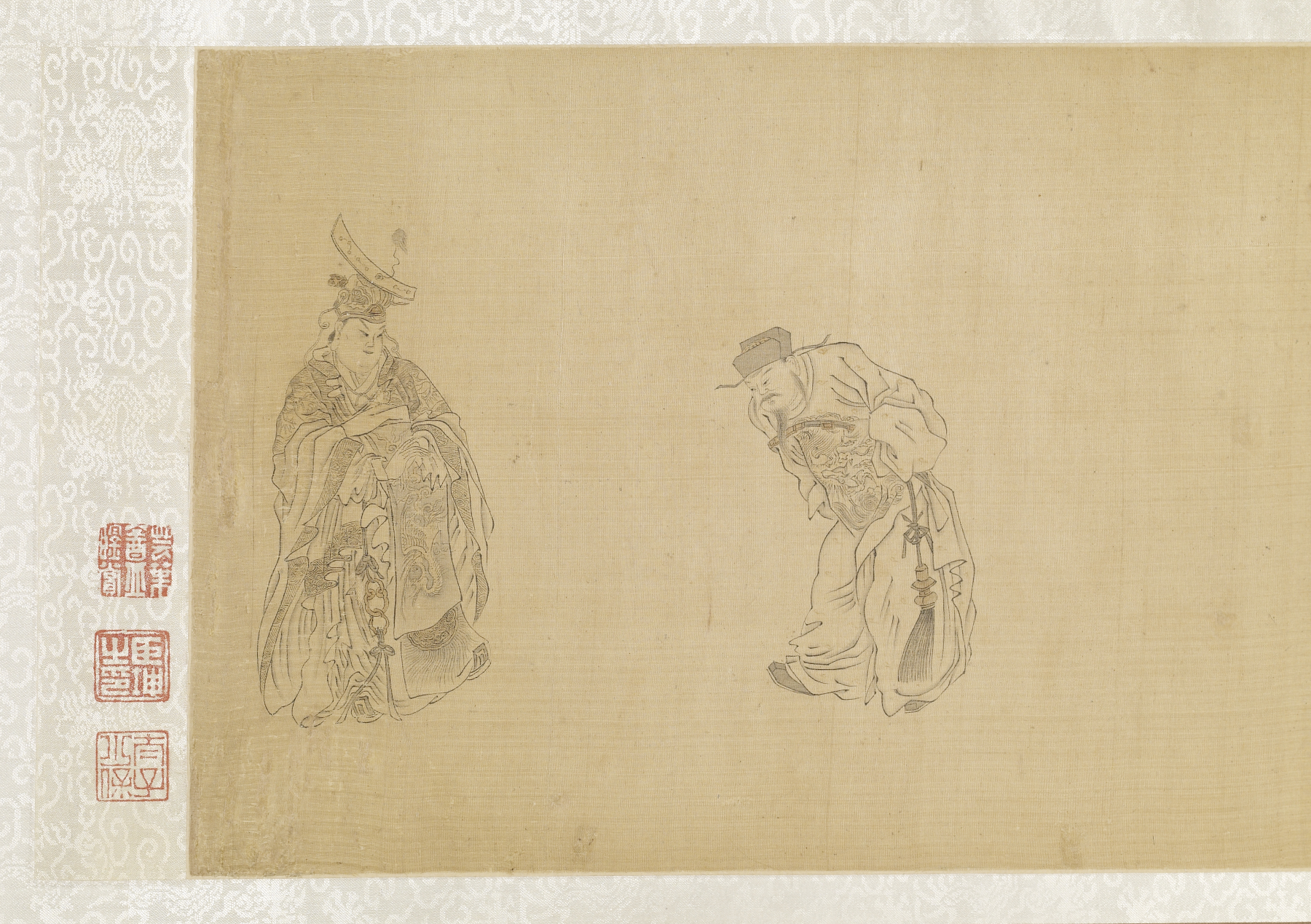

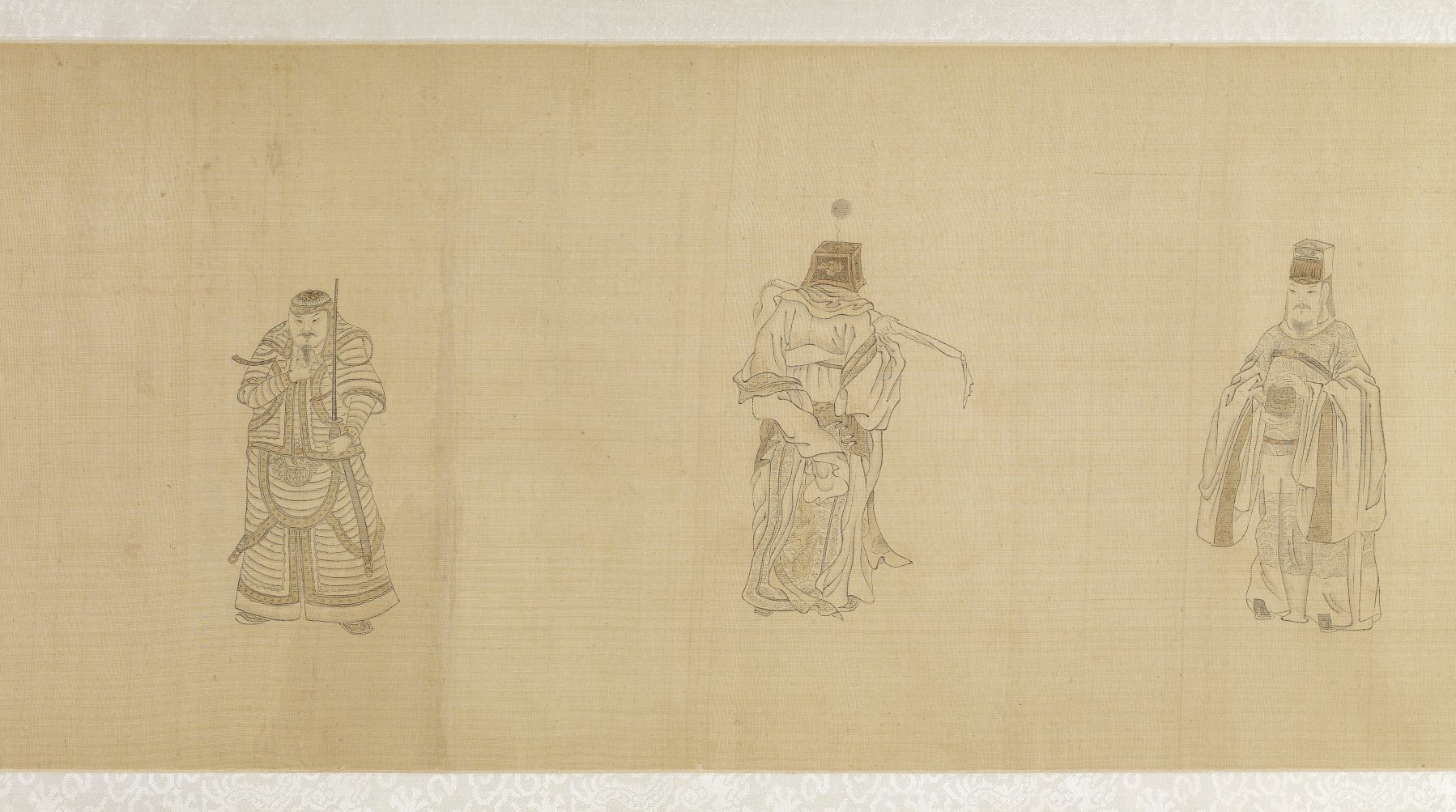

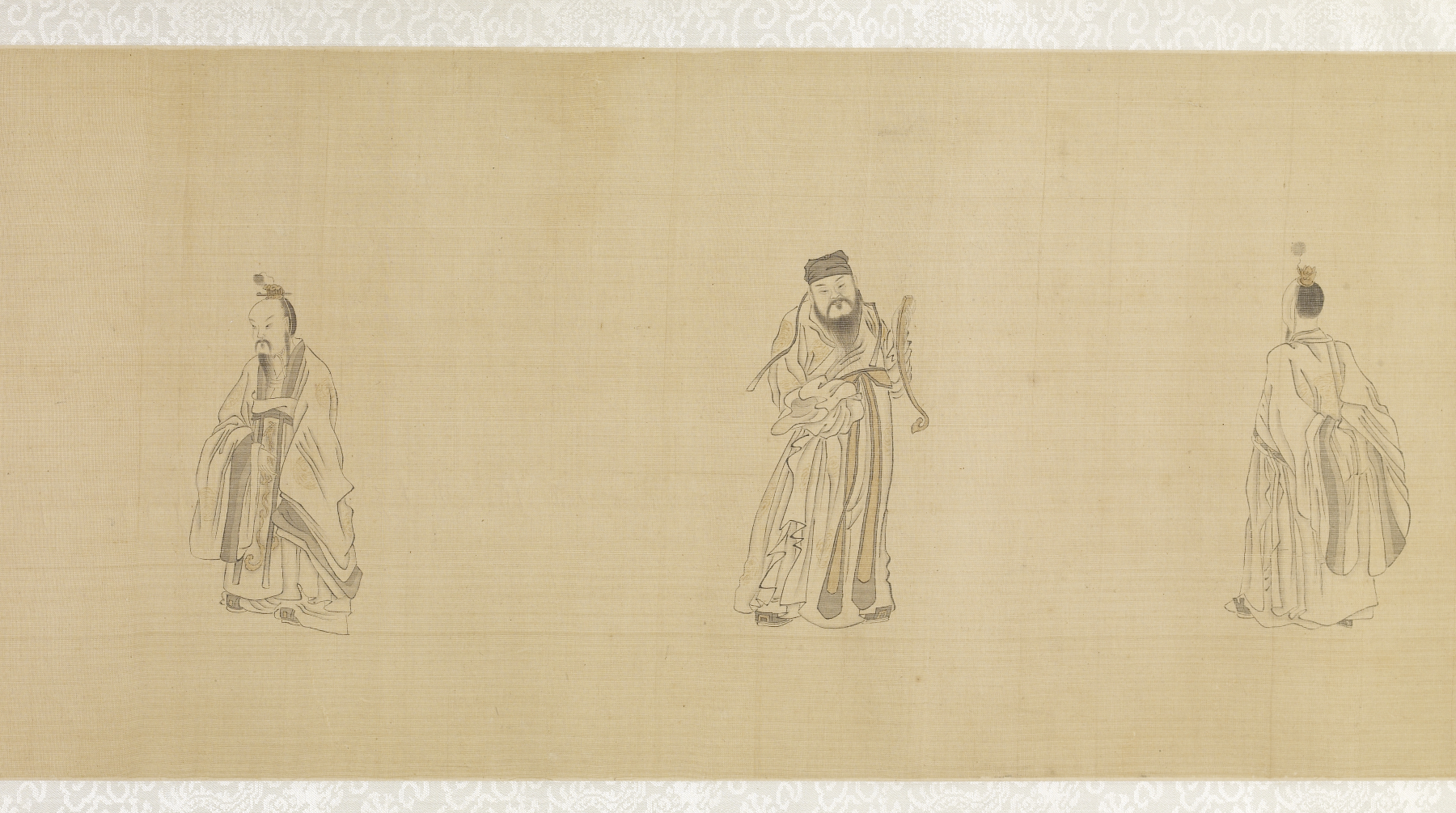

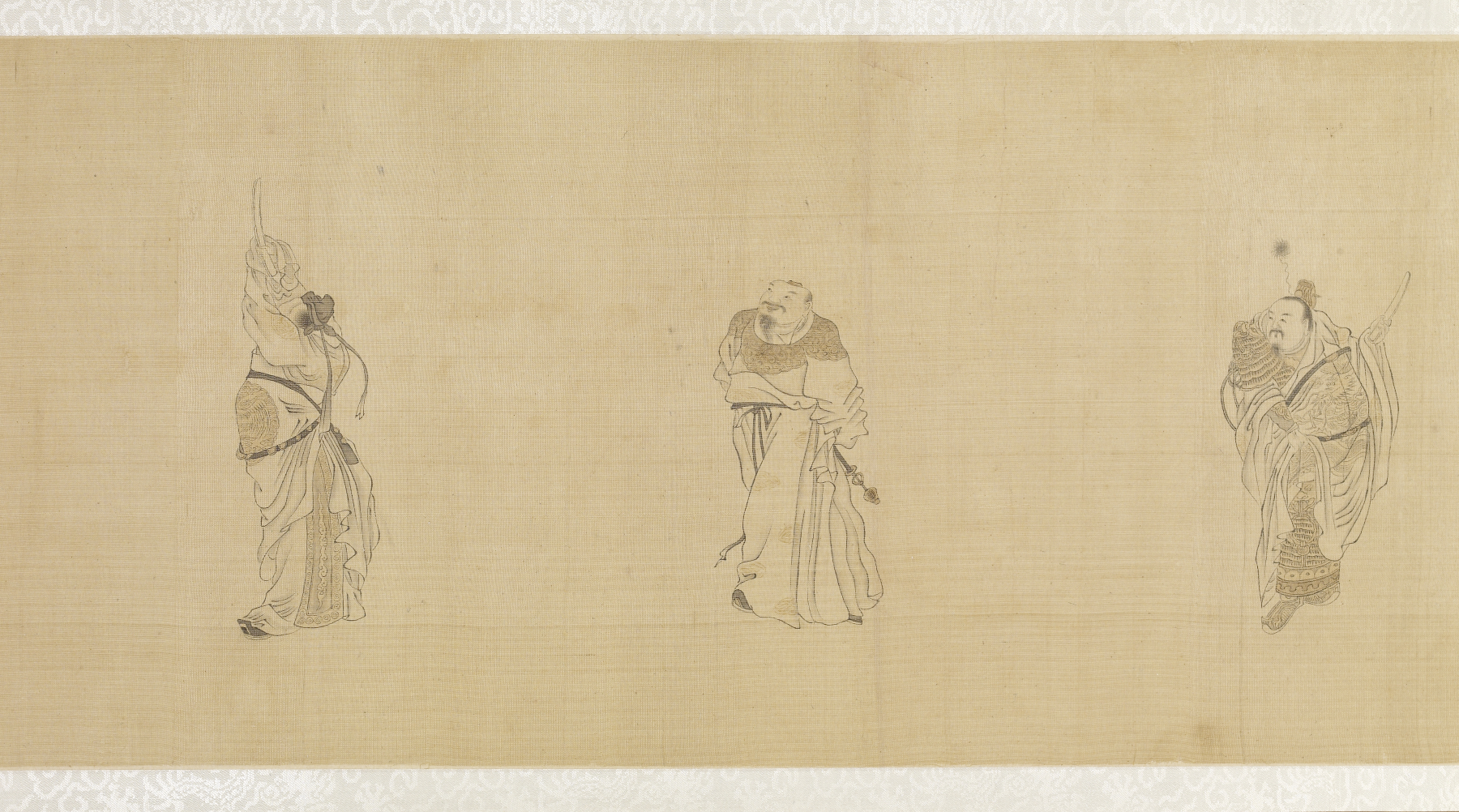

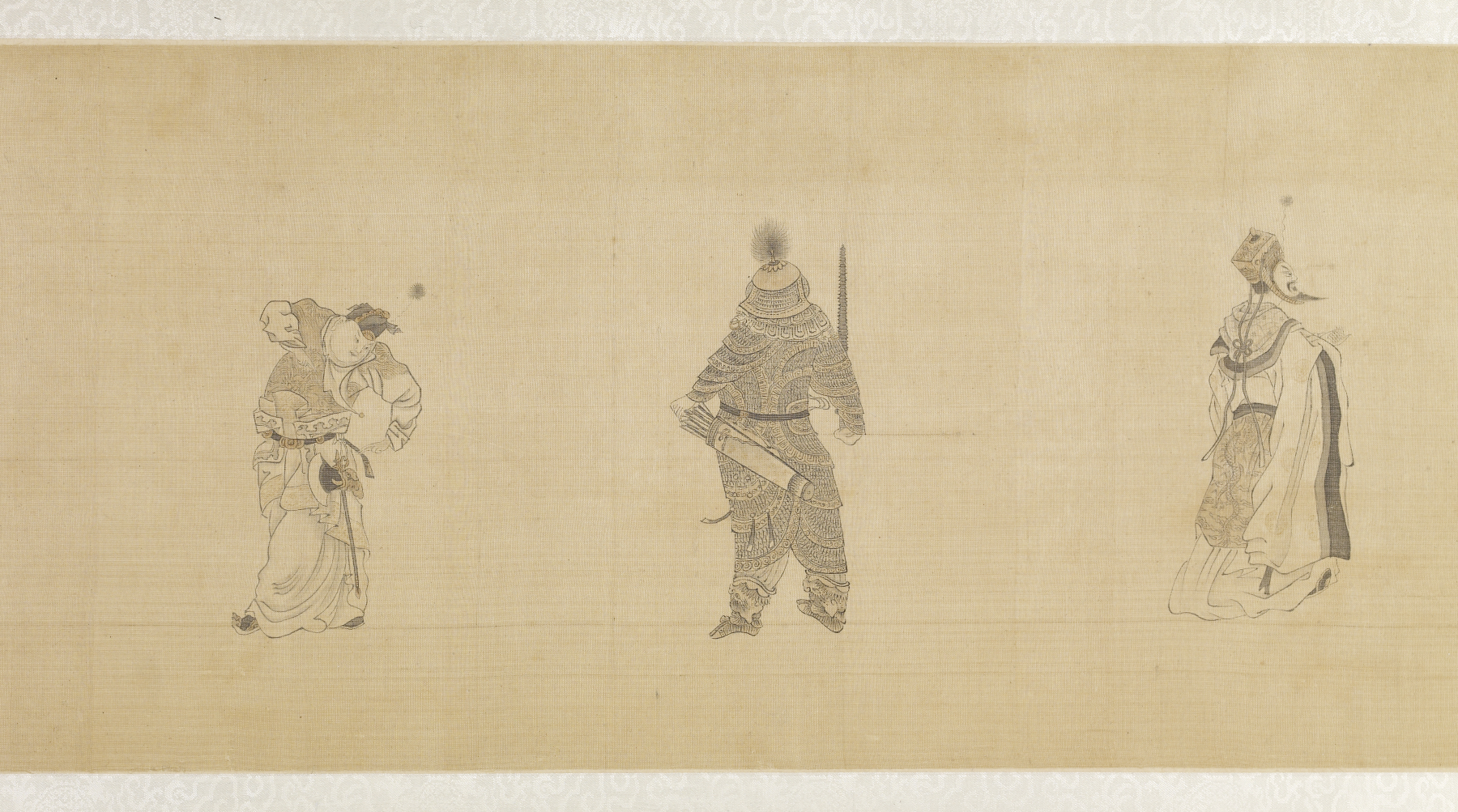

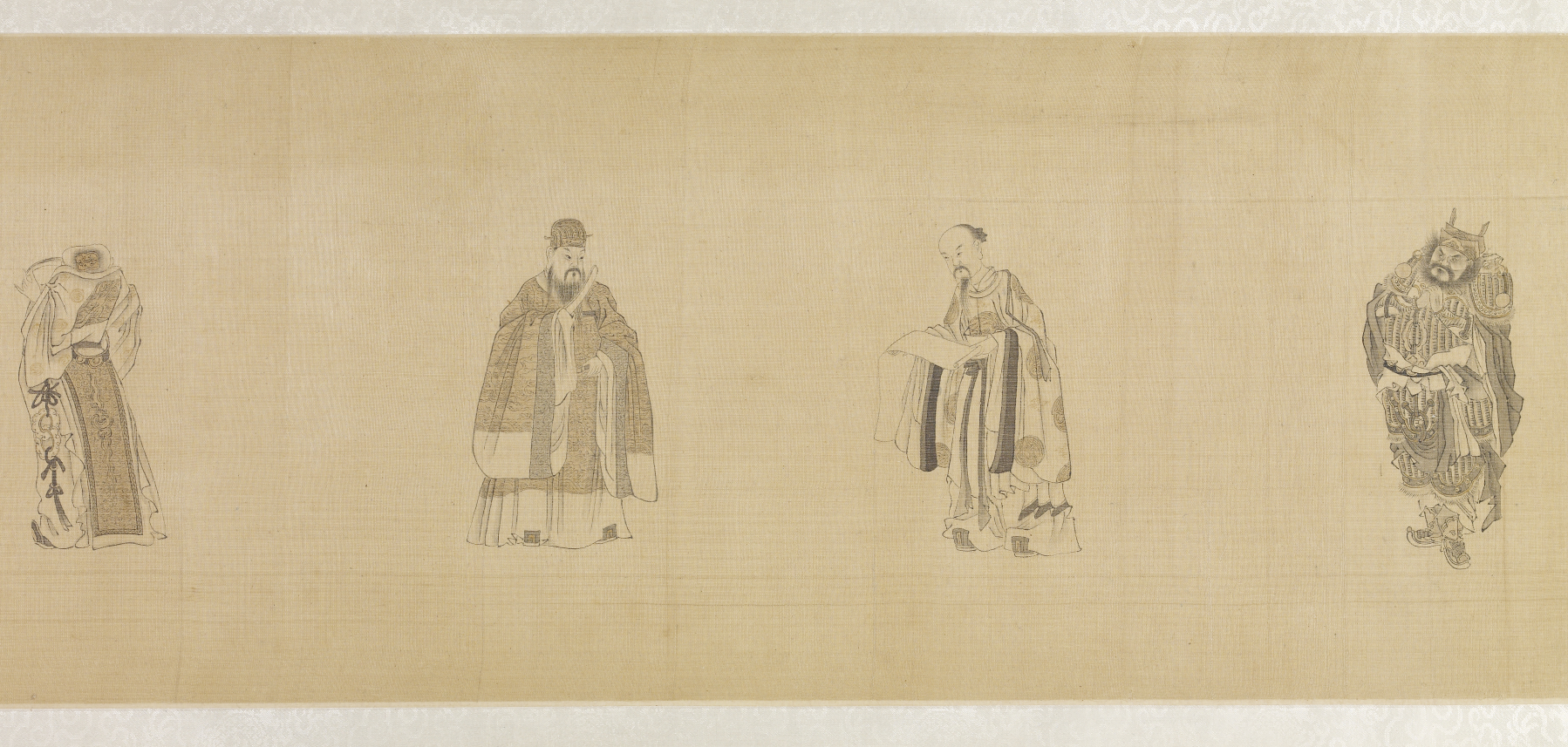

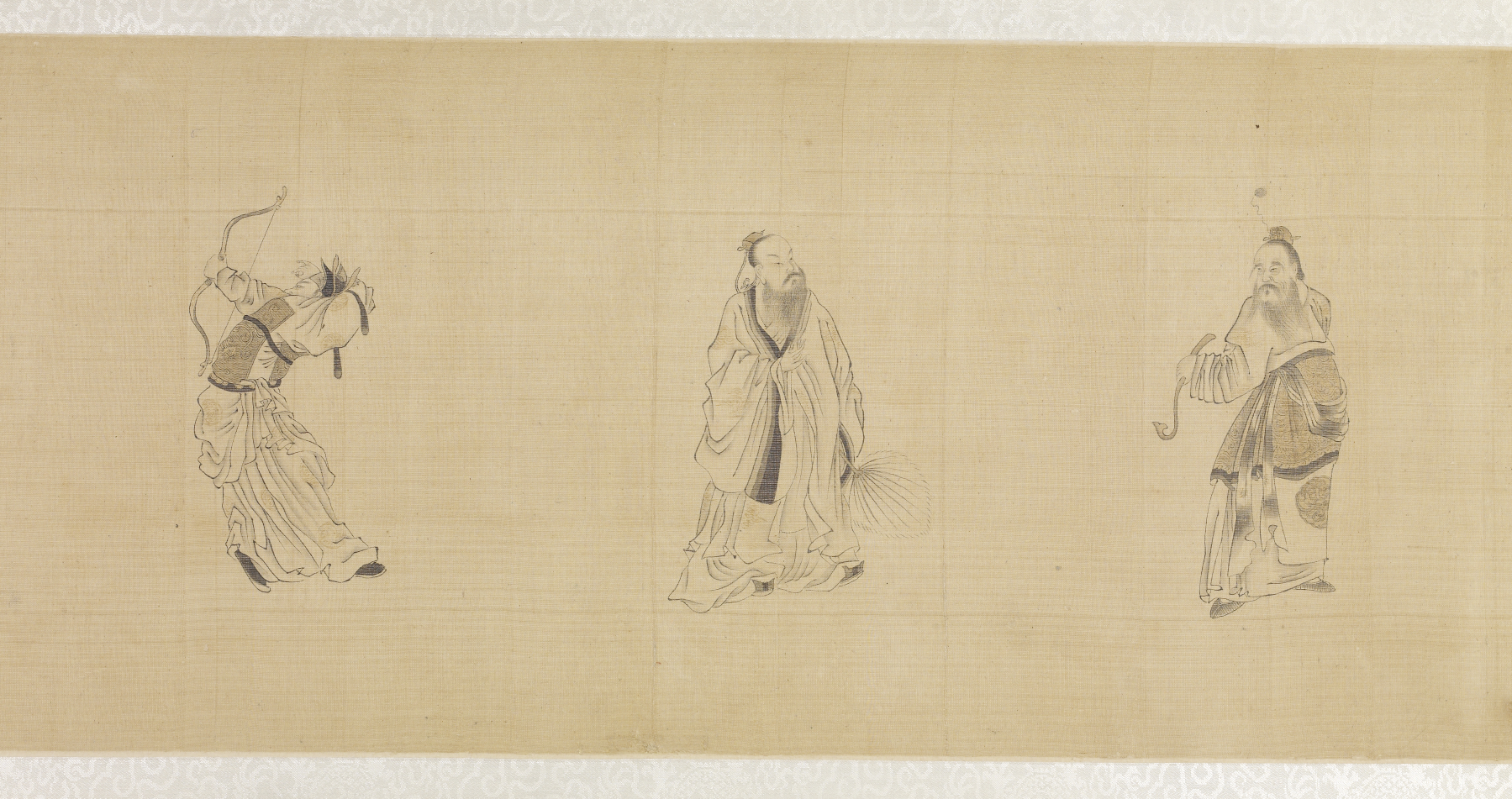

== After Taizong ==
Five Tang emperors after Taizong also honored officials whom they felt have contributed greatly to the empire, by hanging their portraits in Lingyan Pavilion. Such officials include Guo Ziyi (honored by Tang Daizong and Tang Dezong) and Li Guangbi (honored by Tang Suzong), who were vital in putting down the An Lushan Rebellion. In a twist of fate, Chu Suiliang, whose calligraphy was used when honoring the original 24, was posthumously inaugurated into Lingyan Pavilion by Tang Dezong, and again by Tang Xuanzong, Li Chen.

Some officials were commemorated by more than one emperor. Thus, while the final number of portraits hung in the pavilion was 132, only about 100 officials were honored.

However, some officials were inaugurated by emperors who seek to curry favor through such a move. This was due to the weakening of imperial authority after the An Lushan Rebellion. Such officials include enunchs like Yu Chaoen and Cheng Yuanzhen, and generals like Tian Chengsi who helped usher in the era of fanzhen which became largely autonomous and defied control by the imperial court.

== See also ==
- The 28 Generals of Yuntai
