= Zhangsun Shunde =

- 长孙顺德
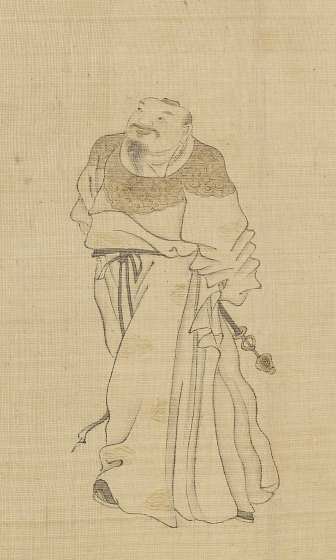

Lieutenant Commander of Right Guard (右勋卫）
- In office ?–c.612
- Monarch: Emperor Yang of Sui

General Commander (统军)
- In office 617–618
- Monarch: Li Yuan

Grand (Senior) General of Left Brave Guard (左骁卫大将军)
- In office 618–627
- Monarchs: Emperor Gaozu of Tang and then Emperor Taizong of Tang

Prefectural Governor of Zezhou (泽州刺史)
- In office 629–630
- Monarch: Emperor Taizong of Tang

Personal details
- Born: 565; Luoyang
- Died: 631; Chang'an
- Children: Zhangsun Jiaqing (son); At least one daughtor, name unknown
- Parent: Zhangsun Kai (father)
- Occupation: General, Official
- Title: Duke of Pi (邳国公)
- Posthumous name: Xiang (襄)

Zhangsun Shunde (Chinese: 长孙顺德), titled Duke of Pi, was a general and officer in the early Tang dynasty. He is one of 24 honored founding officials of the Tang dynasty at Lingyan Pavilion, and also a distant relative to Zhangsun Wuji and Empress Zhangsun. They share a common ancestor, Zhangsun Zhi (Prince Wenxuan of Shangdang of the Northern Wei dynasty), five generations ago for Zhangsun Wuji and Empress Zhangsun, and four generations ago for Zhangsun Shunde.

Zhangsun Shunde was born in a sinicized Xianbei clan. His grandfather Zhangsun Shiliang was the prefectural governor of Qinzhou during the Northern Zhou dynasty, and his father Zhangsun Kai was a grand general and high-ranked official during the Sui dynasty. Zhangsun Shunde served as a lieutenant commander in the Right Guard during Emperor Yang of Sui's reign. In 612, Emperor Yang launched a massive campaign against Goguryeo, and Zhangsun Shunde was drafted as a low-ranked commander. Zhangsun Shunde refused to go, and thus fled to Taiyuan and secretly became a subordinate to Li Yuan, who later rebelled against Sui in 617, and established the Tang dynasty in 618. During the rebellion, Zhangsun Shunde made major contributions, including breaking through Huoyi and Linfen, defeating the Sui general Qutu Tong, and occupying Shaan County. Later, he was given the title Duke of Xue, and appointed to Grand General of the Left Brave Guard. In 627, he was found guilty of corruption. Emperor Taizong of Tang gave him some warmings by embarrassing him publicly with sarcastic rewards. Later in the same year, he was unintentionally involved in a coup led by his friend Li Xiaochang, the Prince of Yi'an. As a result, he was removed from his office and deprived of all his titles and ranks. One year later, Yuwen Shiji visited him, and then told Emperor Taizong that he was sad and drunk in his residence. Emperor Taizong had pity on him and restored his ranks. He was then appointed to be the prefectural governor of Zezhou. During his term, he returned farmlands that were illegally occupied or expropriated by his predecessors to peasants. However, not long after that he was involved in some other law cases and removed from his position again. Then, his daughter died, which made him slide into a depression. He died shortly after. In 639, he was posthumously rewarded the title Duke of Pi.
