= Qutu Tong =

- 屈突通
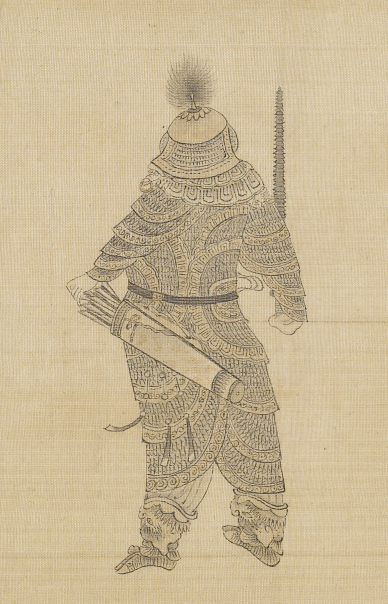

Huya General
- In office unknown – 597
- Monarch: Emperor Wen of Sui

Grand Commander of Imperial Guard Army
- In office 597 – c. 608
- Monarchs: Emperor Wen of Sui; Emperor Yang of Sui

General of Left Xiao Guard Army
- In office c. 608 – 613
- Monarch: Emperor Yang of Sui

General of Left Xiaoji Guard Army
- In office 613 – 618
- Monarch: Emperor Yang of Sui

Chief minister of Ministry of Wars
- In office 618 – 621
- Monarch: Emperor Gaozu of Tang

Grand Commander of Shaandong Military Circuit
- In office 621 – 626
- Monarch: Emperor Gaozu of Tang

Chief minister of Ministry of Works
- In office 626 – 628
- Monarch: Emperor Taizong of Tang

Personal details
- Born: 557; Chang'an
- Died: November 628; Luoyang
- Parent: Qutu Changqing (father)
- Occupation: General, Official
- Xianbei Name: Tandouba (坦豆拔)
- Title: Duke of Jiang (蒋国公)
- Posthumous name: Zhong (忠)

Qutu Tong (557 – 19 November 628), titled Duke of Jiang, Xianbei name Tandouba (坦豆拔), was a general in the Sui and Tang dynasties of China. He was listed as one of 24 founding officials of the Tang dynasty honored on the Lingyan Pavilion due to his contributions in wars during the transitional period from Sui to Tang.

== Personal life ==
Qutu Tong is a descendant of Xianbei people. Originally, he was a general serving for the Sui dynasty. In his early years, he was sent to Liangzhou by Emperor Wen of Sui to inspect the horse trading run by local governors and generals. He discovered serious corruption in the horse market that involved hundreds of people in local government and the local army. The emperor was extremely angry and planned to execute all people involved in this corruption. Many other officials in the central court agreed with the emperor's decision. However, Qutu Tong thought that although those people were guilty, it was too brutal to kill them all. He said to the emperor that human lives were way more important than horses. He would sacrifice his own life in order to save hundreds of lives, so that people would not criticize the emperor for his brutality. The emperor was impressed by Qutu Tong's argument and gave his pardon to those hundreds of people.

Qutu Tong was promoted to a higher position in the army after Emperor Yang of Sui took the throne. When the emperor was in the frontline against Goguryeo or touring the southern China along the Grand Canal, Qutu Tong was responsible for defending the de facto vice capital city of Luoyang. In 613, Qutu Tong took part in the battle that defeated the rebellion army led by Yang Xuangan near Luoyang. In 614, Qutu Tong suppressed the peasant uprising led by Liu Jialun in Yan'an.

In 618, Li Yuan (Emperor Gaozu of Tang) established the Tang dynasty and attacked the region guarded by Qutu Tong. Initially, Qutu Tong was able to defeat the Tang's army led by Liu Wenjing. However, due to the short of supply and the low morale of soldiers, Qutu Tong was defeated by Tang's army. Qutu Tong and Sang Xianhe submitted to the Tang dynasty after this battle, and was promoted to be the chief minister (Shangshu) of the Ministry of Wars by Emperor Gaozu. Soon after that, Qutu Tong became a follower to Li Shimin, the then Prince of Qin. With Li Shimin, Qutu Tong took part in many battles during the unification war. In the later half of 618, Li Shimin defeated Xue Renguo, the warlord based in Jincheng, during the Battle of Qianshuiyuan. After this battle, many Tang generals grabbed treasures from Xue Renguo's warehouse, but Qutu Tong refused to join them. He was thus praised by the emperor.

From 619 to 620, Li Shimin defeated Liu Wuzhou, the warlord stationed in northern Shanxi. Quto Tong took part in this campaign. In 621, Li Shimin and Li Yuanji led Tang forces to attack Wang Shichong, the warlord in Luoyang. Qutu Tong played a significant role in this campaign. When Li Shimin was making an inspection tour at Xuanwuling (the imperial tomb of the Northern Wei dynasty, which is to the north of Luoyang), he was ambushed by Shan Xiongxin, the best general serving for Wang Shichong. Yuchi Jingde, another Tang general, saved Li Shimin and defeated Shan Xiongxin at Xuanwuling. Qutu Tong took this chance to launch an attack to Wang Shichong's headquarter. This attack caused remarkable damage to Wang's army, and Qutu Tong successfully captured Chen Zhilve, one of top generals in Wang's army.

In 621, Dou Jiande, another warlord based in Hebei, led his army marching towards Luoyang trying to save Wang Shichong. Li Shimin led 3000 elite soldiers defeated Dou Jiande at Hulao Pass. During the same time, Qutu Tong played a large role in assisting Li Yuanji in besieging Luoyang so that Wang Shichong could not join forces with Dou Jiande. After the Battle of Hulao, Qutu Tong was rewarded the highest military achievement, and was promoted to the Grand Commander of Shaandong Military Circuit.

When the rivalry between Li Shimin and Li Jiancheng, the crown prince, was heating up, Qutu Tong chose to stick with Li Shimin. He supported Li Shimin during the Xuanwu Gate Incident in 626 that won Li Shimin the crown of emperor. Li Shimin further promoted and rewarded him after the incident. In 628, Qutu Tong died in Luoyang. In 634, Qutu Tong was listed as one of 24 founding officials of the Tang dynasty and had his portrayal exhibited on the Lingyan Pavilion.

== Family ==
Father:

- Qutu Changqing: A local governor of Qiongzhou in Northern Zhou dynasty

Brother:

- Qutu Gai: County magistrate of Chang'an. Well known for his strictness in law enforcement.

Sons:

- Qutu Shou: Succeeded the title Duke of Jiang
- Qutu Quan: Guoyi Commandant; Local governor of Yingzhou

Grandson:

- Qutu Zhongxiang: Local governor of Yingzhou
