= Liu Wuzhou =

Dingyang Khan (定楊可汗) or Dingyang Tianzi (定楊天子)
| Family name: | Liu (劉, líu) |
| Given name: | Wuzhou (武周, wǔ zhōu) |
| Posthumous name: | None |

Liu Wuzhou (Chinese: 劉武周; died 28 August 622?) was a rebel leader who rose against the rule of the Chinese Sui dynasty late in the dynasty's history, and he took imperial style—although it was not completely clear whether the title he took was khan or tianzi. He was initially only able to take control of modern northern Shanxi and parts of central Inner Mongolia, but after Li Yuan established the Tang dynasty at Chang'an as its Emperor Gaozu in 618, he, with support from Eastern Tujue, briefly captured Li Yuan's initial power base of Taiyuan in 619, posing a major threat to Li Yuan's rule. In 620, Li Yuan's son Li Shimin (the future Emperor Taizong) counterattacked, and not only recaptured Taiyuan but further captured Liu's power base Mayi (modern Shuozhou, Shanxi), forcing Liu to flee to Eastern Tujue. When Liu subsequently tried to flee back to Mayi, Eastern Tujue executed him.

== Initial establishment of Dingyang ==
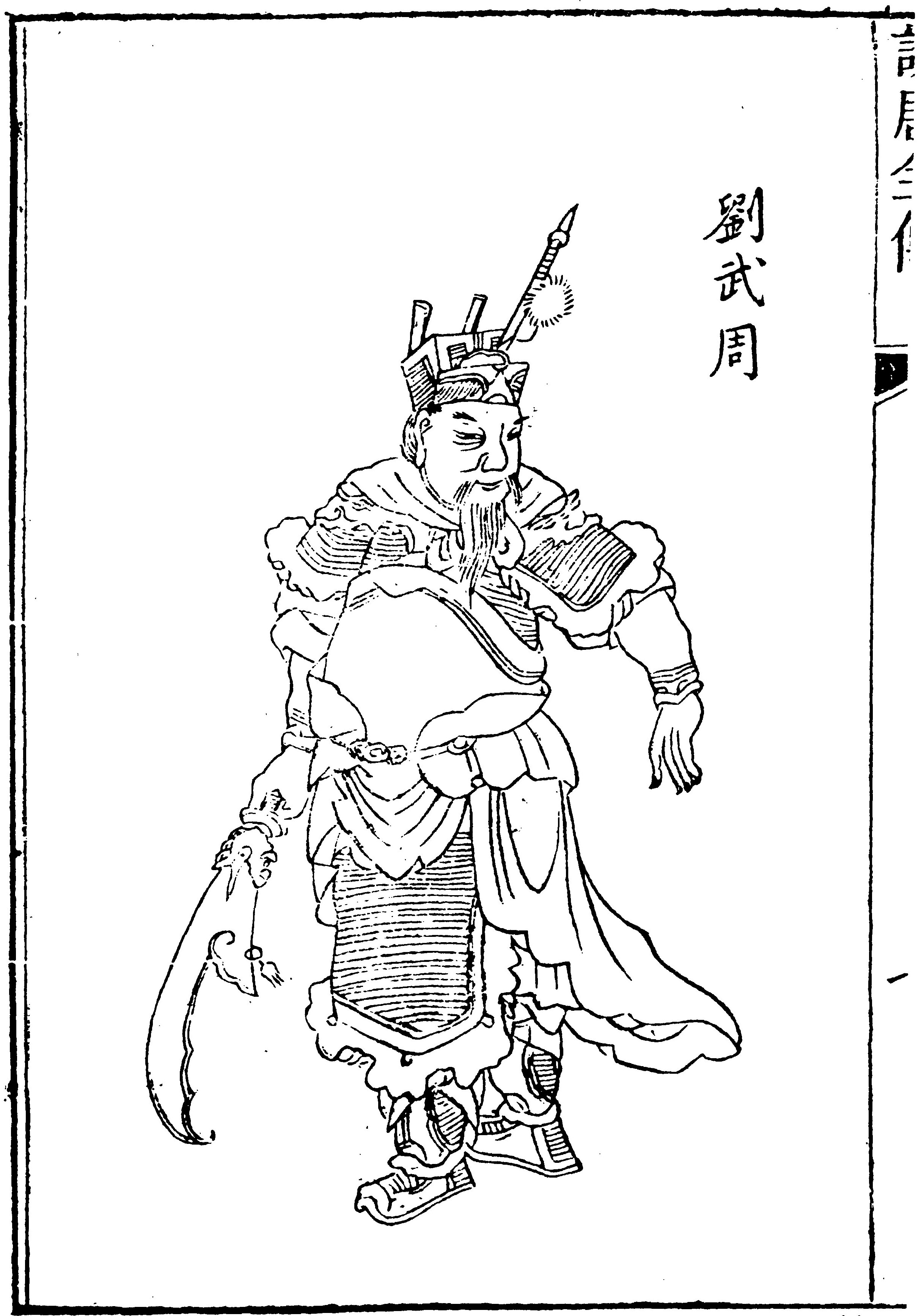
Liu Wuzhou

Liu Wuzhou's clan was originally from Hejian Commandery (河間郡, roughly modern Baoding, Hebei). His father Liu Kuang (劉匡) relocated to Mayi (in modern Shuozhou, Shanxi). Liu Wuzhou's mother was Liu Kuang's wife Lady Zhao. Liu Wuzhou was known for his strengths and skills at archery, and he often spent time congregating with people with similar dispositions. His older brother Liu Shanbo (劉山伯) was not pleased with this, and often rebuked him, stating, "You are careless with your friendships, and one day you will destroy our clan." Liu Wuzhou therefore left home and went to the Sui dynasty's eastern capital Luoyang, where he served under the general Yang Yichen. During Yang's participation of the campaigns against Goguryeo, Liu Wuzhou, on account of his accomplishments, was made a Xiaowei (校尉)—an army officer rank just below a general.

At some later point, Liu Wuzhou returned home and continued to be a Xiaowei for the commandery militia. At that time, the commandery governor Wang Rengong (王仁恭), who was corrupt and unable to care for the poor, was impressed with Liu for his fame in the commandery, and he gave Liu the command of his personal guards. Liu carried on an affair with one of Wang's servant girls, and was afraid that he would be punished if news leaked. He therefore told the people of the commandery that Wang was unwilling to aid the poor and the famished—causing there to be general discontent among the people. He then took leave on account of illness, but when the local gentry came visiting him, he invited them to a feast and declared his intent to rebel; they agreed to join him. In spring 617, he took his men to the commandery government and killed Wang. The people of the commandery submitted, and he opened up the food storages to feed the poor. He gathered about 10,000 soldiers and declared himself commandery governor, and he submitted to Eastern Tujue. When officials of the nearby Yanmen Commandery (roughly modern Xinzhou, Shanxi), Chen Xiaoyi (陳孝意) and Wang Zhibian (王智辯) attacked him, he struck back in conjunction with Eastern Tujue, killing Wang and forcing Chen to flee. He then captured Loufan Commandery (樓煩郡, part of modern Xinzhou) and pillaged Fenyang Palace (汾陽宮)—one of the numerous subsidiary palaces that Emperor Yang built around the empire—and took the ladies in waiting and gave them to Eastern Tujue's Shibi Khan Ashina Duojishi as a tribute; in return, Ashina Duojishi sent him horses. Liu then also captured Dingxiang Commandery (定襄郡, roughly modern Hohhot, Inner Mongolia). Ashina Duojishi then created him "Dingyang Khan"—i.e., "the Khan who rules over Yang." (Yang was the name of Sui's imperial clan.) Ashina Duojishi also bestowed on Liu a great banner with a symbol of a wolf's head. Liu then declared himself emperor. He created his wife Lady Ju empress, and he changed his era name to further show independence from Sui. Soon, he captured Yanmen as well. (The Sui general in charge at Taiyuan, Li Yuan, was unable to stop Liu, and it was partly because of this that Li Yuan's son Li Shimin was able to persuade Li Yuan to rebel as well to avoid possible punishment by Emperor Yang, and Li Yuan did so later in 617, capturing the capital Chang'an and declaring Emperor Yang's grandson Yang You emperor (as Emperor Gong); in 618, after hearing of Emperor Yang's death at Yangzhou, had Yang You yield the throne to him, establishing the Tang dynasty as its Emperor Gaozu.) In spring 619, Ashina Duojishi apparently was planning to launch a major incursion into Chinese territory, and he had Liu and another rebel ruler, Liang Shidu the Emperor of Liang, join him, but Ashina Duojishi soon died, and Tujue abandoned the campaign.

== Campaign against Tang ==
Map of the situation in northern China during the transition from the Sui to the Tang, with the main contenders for the throne and the main military operations

Liu Wuzhou, however, launched a campaign against Tang himself in late spring 619, with collateral support by Eastern Tujue forces. In summer 619, he approached Taiyuan, then defended by Emperor Gaozu's son, Li Yuanji the Prince of Qi. Li Yuanji sent the general Zhang Da (張達) against Liu, despite Zhang's reluctance, as Li Yuanji gave Zhang only a small army, and Liu defeated Zhang. Zhang, angry at Li Yuanji, instead surrendered to Liu and led Liu to capture Yuci (榆次, in modern Jinzhong, Shanxi). Soon, Liu put Taiyuan under siege. Li Yuanji initially fought him off, but soon Liu captured Shi (石州, roughly modern Lüliang, Shanxi) and Jie (介州, also part of modern Jinzhong) Prefectures, and soon, Liu's general Huang Ziying (黃子英) defeated and captured the Tang generals Jiang Baoyi (姜寶誼) and Li Zhongwen (李仲文), although Jiang and Li Zhongwen soon fled from Liu's camp.

Around the same time, Liu received additional support, in the form of the agrarian rebel leader Song Jin'gang (宋金剛), who was initially an adherent of Wei Dao'er (魏刀兒), until Wei was defeated and killed by Dou Jiande the Prince of Xia. Song was unable to resist Dou, and fled to Liu, who, believing Song to be a capable general, created him the Prince of Song and greatly honored him, even giving Song half of his possessions as a gift. Song then divorced his wife and married Liu's sister. Song then suggested to Liu that he should first capture Bing Prefecture (并州, i.e., Taiyuan) and then further attack south to try to capture more territory, to seek to unite China.

The mounting defeats concerned Tang's Emperor Gaozu, and he sent one of his senior advisors, Pei Ji, with a sizeable army to face Liu. Pei reached Jie Prefecture in the fall and placed its capital, Jiexiu (介休), under siege, with Song defending. Song soon cut off Pei's water supply, and the Tang army began to weaken in thirst, and it was defeated by Song. After the battle, Liu again approached Taiyuan, and Li Yuanji, in panic, abandoned Taiyuan and fled back to the Tang capital Chang'an. Liu then moved his capital from Mayi to Taiyuan, and soon, Song captured Jin (晉州) and Gui (澮州, together roughly modern Linfen, Shanxi) as well, and Pei was unable to resist. In shock, Tang's Emperor Gaozu considered entirely abandoning the Hedong (河東, i.e., modern Shanxi) region, but his son Li Shimin (the later Emperor Taizong) objected, offering to engage Liu. Emperor Gaozu then commissioned Li Shimin with an army and had him head toward Liu's position.

== Defeat and death ==
Li Shimin crossed the Yellow River, and while he initially had problem with food supplies, he was able to persuade the people in the country to supply his army. He then refused to engage Song, trying to wear Song down. Meanwhile, however, another Tang army, commanded by Emperor Gaozu's cousin Li Xiaoji (李孝基) the Prince of Yong'an, assisted by another cousin, Dugu Huai'en (獨孤懷恩) and two other officials, Yu Yun (于筠) and Tang Jian (唐儉), was attacking Liu's ally Lü Chongmao (呂崇茂), then at Xia (夏縣, in modern Yuncheng, Shanxi). Lü sought aid from Song, and Song sent his subordinates Yuchi Gong and Xun Xiang (尋相) to attack Li Xiaoji, defeating him, and capturing him, Dugu, Yu, Tang, as well as another key general, Liu Shirang (劉世讓). (Liu Xiaoji soon tried to flee and was executed by Liu Wuzhou.) When Yuchi and Xun then sought to aid another ally, Wang Xingben (王行本), a Sui general still holding out against Tang at Pufan (蒲反, in modern Yuncheng as well), but they were defeated by Li Shimin and forced to withdraw; Wang subsequently was forced to surrender in spring 620, and Emperor Gaozu executed him. Later in spring 620, Liu Wuzhou attacked Tang's Lu Prefecture (潞州, roughly modern Changzhi, Shanxi), and while he was initially successful, he was unable to capture its capital.

Later, Huang Ziying, while ordered to protect the roads of supplies, was assaulted and killed by Tang general Zhang Dezheng (張德政). In summer 620, Li Shimin, believing Song's army to be worn out, launched a major counterattack, first defeating Xun Xiang, and then advancing quickly, engaged Song at Queshu Canyon (雀鼠谷, in modern Jinzhong), defeating Song eight times, eventually forcing Song to flee. Yuchi and Xun surrendered. Liu, hearing of Song's defeat, abandoned Taiyuan in panic and fled to Eastern Tujue. Song tried to battle Tang forces again, but could not gather his troops any more, and therefore fled to Eastern Tujue as well.

At a later date—probably August 622, as the Old Book of Tang and the New Book of Tang both stated that Liu's campaigns lasted over a span of six calendar years—Liu tried to flee back to Mayi to reestablish himself, against Eastern Tujue orders, and when this was discovered, he was executed.

== Era name ==
- Tianxing (天興 tiān xīng) 617–620

== Personal information ==
- Father
  - Liu Kuang (劉匡)
- Mother
  - Lady Zhao, Liu Kuang's wife
- Wife
  - Empress Ju (created 617)

Chinese royalty
| Preceded by Emperor Yang of Sui | Emperor of China (Northern Shanxi); 617–620 | Succeeded by Emperor Gaozu of Tang |
| Preceded by Emperor Gaozu of Tang | Emperor of China (Central/Southern Shanxi); 619–620 | Succeeded by Emperor Gaozu of Tang |
