= Dou (surname) =

Dou (窦/竇)
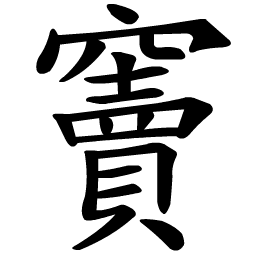
- Pronunciation: Dòu (Mandarin)
- Language: Chinese

Origin
- Language: Old Chinese

Other names
- Variant form: Tou4

Dou is the Mandarin pinyin romanization of the Chinese surname written 竇 in traditional Chinese and 窦 in simplified Chinese. It is romanized Tou in Wade–Giles. Dou is listed 39th in the Song dynasty classic text Hundred Family Surnames. As of 2008, it is the 219th most common surname in China, shared by 380,000 people.

== Notable people ==
- Empress Dou (Wen) (died 135 BC), wife of Emperor Wen of Han and mother of Emperor Jing
- Dou Ying (竇嬰; died 131 BC), Western Han general and chancellor
- Dou Rong (竇融; 16 BC – 62 AD), Eastern Han general and minister
- Dou Gu (died 88), Eastern Han general
- Dou Xian (died 92), Eastern Han general
- Empress Dou (Zhang) (died 97), wife of Emperor Zhang of Han, sister of Dou Xian
- Dou Wu (died 168), Eastern Han official, father of Empress Dou Miao
- Dou Miao (died 172), wife of Emperor Huan of Han
- Dou Chong (竇衝; died 394?), Former Qin general
- Empress Taimu (太穆皇后; 569–613), Tang dynasty empress, wife of Emperor Gaozu, and mother of Emperor Taizong
- Dou Wei (died 618), Tang dynasty chancellor
- Dou Jiande (573–621), Sui dynasty rebel leader
- Dou Kang (died 621), Tang dynasty chancellor
- Dou Dexuan (598–666), Tang dynasty chancellor
- Empress Zhaocheng (昭成皇后; died 693), mother of Emperor Xuanzong of Tang
- Dou Huaizhen (died 713), Tang dynasty chancellor
- Dou Can (734–793), Tang dynasty chancellor
- Dou Wentao (竇文濤; born 1967), Phoenix TV host
- Dou Wei (born 1969), singer-songwriter
- Shawn Dou or Dou Xiao (born 1988), Chinese-Canadian actor
- Chunxia Dou (窦春霞), Chinese electrical engineering professor
