= 618 =

Calendar year

618 in various calendars
Gregorian calendar	618; DCXVIII
Ab urbe condita	1371
Armenian calendar	67; ԹՎ ԿԷ
Assyrian calendar	5368
Balinese saka calendar	539–540
Bengali calendar	24–25
Berber calendar	1568
Buddhist calendar	1162
Burmese calendar	−20
Byzantine calendar	6126–6127
Chinese calendar	丁丑年 (Fire Ox); 3315 or 3108 — to — 戊寅年 (Earth Tiger); 3316 or 3109
Coptic calendar	334–335
Discordian calendar	1784
Ethiopian calendar	610–611
Hebrew calendar	4378–4379
- Hindu calendars
Vikram Samvat	674–675
Shaka Samvat	539–540
Kali Yuga	3718–3719
Holocene calendar	10618
Iranian calendar	4 BP – 3 BP
Islamic calendar	4 BH – 3 BH
Japanese calendar	N/A
Javanese calendar	508–509
Julian calendar	618; DCXVIII
Korean calendar	2951
Minguo calendar	1294 before ROC 民前1294年
Nanakshahi calendar	−850
Seleucid era	929/930 AG
Thai solar calendar	1160–1161
Tibetan calendar	མེ་མོ་གླང་ལོ་ (female Fire-Ox); 744 or 363 or −409 — to — ས་ཕོ་སྟག་ལོ་ (male Earth-Tiger); 745 or 364 or −408

Emperor Gaozu of the Tang dynasty

Year 618 (DCXVIII) was a common year starting on Sunday of the Julian calendar. The denomination 618 for this year has been used since the early medieval period, when the Anno Domini calendar era became the prevalent method in Europe for naming years.

== Events ==
=== By place ===
==== Byzantine Empire ====
- Byzantine–Sassanian War: A Persian expeditionary force under Shahrbaraz invades Egypt, and occupies the province. After defeating the Byzantine garrisons in the Nile Valley, the Persians march across the Libyan Desert as far as Cyrene.
- The Persians besiege Alexandria; the defence of the city is led by Nicetas (cousin of emperor Heraclius). The Byzantine resistance is undermined by a blockade of the harbor; the usual grain supplies are cut off from Egypt to Constantinople.

==== Asia ====
- June 18 – The Sui dynasty ends: Rebel leader Li Yuan captures Luoyang, and has Emperor Yángdi murdered. He proclaims himself emperor Gao Zu and establishes the Tang dynasty, one of the most notable dynasties in Chinese history, which will last for almost 300 years.
- October 6 – Battle of Yanshi: Wang Shichong decisively defeats Li Mi, during the transition from Sui to Tang civil war.
- November 29 – Battle of Qianshuiyuan: The Tang dynasty scores a decisive victory over their rival Xue Rengao.
- Tong Yabghu Qaghan becomes the new ruler (khagan) of the Western Turkic Khaganate, founding the Khazar Khaganate. He maintains close relations with the Tang dynasty, and possibly marries into the imperial family.
- Songtsän Gampo becomes the first emperor of the Tibetan Empire, after his father Namri Songtsen is poisoned. During his reign he expands Tibet's power beyond Lhasa (Tibetan Plateau) and the Yarlung Valley.
- Yeongnyu becomes ruler of the Korean kingdom of Goguryeo.

=== By topic ===
==== Religion ====
- November 8 – Pope Adeodatus I dies in Rome after a 3-year reign, in which he has reversed the policies of his predecessors, Boniface IV and Gregory I, who favored monks over the secular clergy. Adeodatus will not be replaced until next year.

== Deaths ==
- April 11 – Emperor Yang of Sui, emperor of the Sui dynasty (b. 569)
- September 3 – Xue Ju, emperor of Qin
- November 8 – Pope Adeodatus I
- December 14 – Xue Rengao, emperor of Qin
- Dou Wei, chancellor of the Tang dynasty
- Fíngen mac Áedo Duib, king of Munster (Ireland)
- John of Conza, Italian rebel leader (or 615)
- Kevin of Glendalough, Irish abbot (b. 498)
- Namri Songtsen, king of Tibet (approximate date)
- Shikui Khagan, ruler of the Western Turkic Khaganate
- Yang Gao, prince of the Sui dynasty (b. 607)
- Yang Hao, prince of the Sui dynasty (b. 586)
- Yang Jian, prince of the Sui dynasty (b. 585)
- Yang Xiu, prince of the Sui dynasty
- Yeongyang, king of Goguryeo (Korea)
- Yu Shiji, official of the Chen- and Sui dynasty
