= Li Yuanji =

Prince of Tang China (603–626)

Li Yuanji 李元吉
- Born: Li Yuanji; 603
- Died: 2 July 626 (aged 22–23); Chang'an, Tang China
- Issue: 5 sons and 5 daughters, all sons were executed
Posthumous name
- Prince La of Chao (巢剌王)
- Father: Emperor Gaozu of Tang
- Mother: Empress Taimu

Li Yuanji (Chinese: 李元吉; pinyin: Lǐ Yuánjí) (603 – 2 July 626), formally Prince La of Chao (巢剌王), more commonly known by the title of Prince of Qi (齊王), nickname Sanhu (三胡), was an imperial prince of the Chinese Tang dynasty. He was a son of the dynasty's founder Emperor Gaozu of Tang (Li Yuan), and in the intense rivalry developed between his older brothers Li Jiancheng the Crown Prince and Li Shimin the Prince of Qin, he sided with Li Jiancheng and often advocated drastic actions against Li Shimin, including assassination. In 626, Li Shimin, fearing that Li Jiancheng and Li Yuanji were about to kill him, laid an ambush for them at Xuanwu Gate outside the palace and killed Li Jiancheng, Li Yuanji was killed by Yuchi Gong. Li Shimin then effectively forced Emperor Gaozu to yield the throne to him (as Emperor Taizong).

== Background ==
Li Yuanji was born in 603, during the reign of Emperor Wen of Sui. He was the fourth and final son of Li Yuan the Duke of Tang, a hereditary noble, and Li Yuan's wife Duchess Dou, who was herself the daughter of Dou Yi (竇毅), the Duke of Shenwu, and Northern Zhou's Princess Xiangyang. He had three older brothers by Duchess Dou -- Li Jiancheng, Li Shimin, and Li Xuanba (李玄霸, who died in 614). She also gave birth to an older sister of Li Yuanji's, the eventual Princess Pingyang.

In 616, with agrarian rebellions beginning to engulf northern China and frequent Eastern Tujue incursions across the border, Emperor Yang of Sui commissioned Li Yuan to be the commander of the forces at Taiyuan, guarding it against both agrarian rebels and Eastern Tujue. At that time, Li Yuan took Li Shimin with him to Taiyuan, but left Li Jiancheng, Li Yuanji, another son Li Zhiyun (李智雲), and the rest of his household at Hedong (河東, in modern Yuncheng, Shanxi). In 617, Li Yuan, fearful that Emperor Yang might punish him for his inability to suppress the rebels led by Liu Wuzhou the Dingyang Khan, was persuaded by Li Shimin to rebel against Sui rule. He then sent secret messengers to Hedong to summon his sons and to the capital Chang'an to summon his daughter and son-in-law Chai Shao. Li Jiancheng and Li Yuanji secretly travelled to Taiyuan, but left the 13-year-old Li Zhiyun at Hedong.

== Participation in Tang's founding ==
Even before Li Jiancheng, Li Yuanji, and Chai Shao (who, at the urging of Li Yuan's daughter, left Chang'an on his own while she went into hiding) arrived at Taiyuan, Li Yuan rebelled, declaring that he wanted to support Emperor Yang's grandson Yang You the Prince of Dai, then nominally in charge at Chang'an, as emperor, while honoring Emperor Yang as Taishang Huang (retired emperor). In response, Sui officials arrested Li Zhiyun, took him to Chang'an, and executed him.

Li Yuan made Li Jiancheng and Li Shimin both key generals, but the younger Li Yuanji was not, initially, although Li Yuan created him the Duke of Guzang. When Li Yuan subsequently began his campaign toward Chang'an, he left Li Yuanji in charge at Taiyuan. Later that year, after he captured Chang'an and declared Yang You emperor (as Emperor Gong) but kept power for himself as regent, he created Li Yuanji the Duke of Qi and put him in charge of the 15 commanderies around Taiyuan.

In spring 618, Emperor Yang, then at Jiangdu (江都, in modern Yangzhou, Jiangsu), was killed in a coup led by the general Yuwen Huaji. When the news arrived at Chang'an, Li Yuan had Yang You yield the throne to him, establishing the Tang dynasty as its Emperor Gaozu. He created Li Yuanji the Prince of Qi.

It was said that, while he was at Taiyuan, Li Yuanji was arrogant and wasteful, and he often held military exercises with his concubines and servants, involving use of actual armor and arms, and they suffered many casualties in these exercises, including injuries to Li Yuanji himself. His wet nurse Chen Shanyi (陳善意) tried to get him to change his ways, but he had his guards batter her to death. In spring 619, when his assistant Yuwen Xin (宇文歆) reported this to Emperor Gaozu, Emperor Gaozu temporarily removed him from his post. Less than a month later, however, with the people of Taiyuan petitioning to have Li Yuanji kept in charge, Emperor Gaozu restored him. (The traditional historians allege that Li Yuanji pressured the people into petitioning Emperor Gaozu.)

In summer 619, Liu Wuzhou launched an attack on the Taiyuan region, and Li Yuanji sent the general Zhang Da (張達) to resist Liu, despite Zhang's protestations that the army given him was too small to resist Liu. When Zhang was in fact defeated, he surrendered to Liu and served as Liu's guide in subsequent attacks. Liu soon put Taiyuan under siege, and while Li Yuanji initially repelled him, Liu was soon back and again had Taiyuan under siege. In fall 619, Li Yuanji fled with his wife and concubines back to Chang'an, and Liu captured Taiyuan, moving his capital from Mayi (馬邑, in modern Shuozhou, Shanxi) there. (In 620, Li Shimin defeated Liu and recaptured the region.)

In 621, with Li Shimin leading the army in besieging Luoyang, the capital of Wang Shichong's rival Zheng state, Li Yuanji served as Li Shimin's assistant. When subsequently another rival ruler, Dou Jiande the Prince of Xia, came to Wang's aid, Li Shimin left Li Yuanji at Luoyang to continue the siege and to watch Wang, while he himself advanced to Hulao Pass to engage Dou. Li Shimin defeated and captured Dou at the Battle of Hulao, and Wang, in fear, surrendered. Li Shimin received the most honors stemming from the victory, but Li Yuanji also received promotions and honors. Subsequently, when Emperor Gaozu had the government mint new coins, there were strict prohibitions against minting by any other persons, except that Li Shimin and Li Yuanji were each granted the right to have three mints and Pei Ji was granted the right to have one mint. Later that year, when Dou's general Liu Heita rose in resistance to Tang rule and took over all of Dou's former territory, Li Shimin and Li Yuanji were sent against him. Li Shimin defeated Liu in spring 622, forcing Liu to flee to Eastern Tujue. Subsequently, they attacked another rebel leader, Xu Yuanlang the Prince of Lu, when Li Shimin returned to Chang'an and left Li Yuanji in charge of the operations against Xu. Meanwhile, however, Liu returned from Eastern Tujue and again occupied Dou's old territory, and Li Yuanji was not able to stop him.

== Role in the rivalry between Li Jiancheng and Li Shimin ==
Meanwhile, an intense rivalry had developed between Li Jiancheng, who as the oldest son was Emperor Gaozu's crown prince, and Li Shimin, as Li Jiancheng, while a capable general himself, was overshadowed by Li Shimin, who had done much to solidify Tang rule by destroying Liu Wuzhou, Wang Shichong, Dou Jiande, and Xue Rengao. Li Yuanji supported Li Jiancheng in this rivalry, as he believed that if Li Jiancheng became emperor, Li Jiancheng would create him crown prince. Since their mother Duchess Dou had died in 614, the fact that Li Jiancheng and Li Yuanji had better relations with Emperor Gaozu's favored young concubines than Li Shimin did take a notable importance, since those concubines helped rehabilitate Li Jiancheng's standing before Emperor Gaozu, causing him to no longer consider making Li Shimin crown prince instead, as he considered at one point.

After Liu Heita returned from Eastern Tujue and reoccupied old Xia territory, Li Jiancheng, at the suggestion of his staff members Wang Gui and Wei Zheng, volunteered to lead the army against Liu. Emperor Gaozu thus sent Li Jiancheng, assisted by Li Yuanji, against Liu. Around the new year 623, with Liu's forced bogged down while attacking Tang's Wei Prefecture (魏州, in modern Handan, Hebei), Li Jiancheng and Li Yuanji engaged him at Guantao (館陶, in modern Handan as well), crushing him. Liu fled north toward Eastern Tujue, but was ambushed and captured by his own official Zhuge Dewei (諸葛德威), who delivered him to Li Jiancheng. Li Jiancheng executed Liu. China was by this point almost completely unified by Tang. At one point, Li Yuanji tried to persuade Li Jiancheng to have Li Shimin assassinated when Li Shimin was visiting Li Yuanji's mansion, but Li Jiancheng, not having the heart to kill a brother, stopped Li Yuanji from doing so.

In 624, Li Jiancheng requisitioned a number of soldiers from the general Li Yi the Prince of Yan, to supplement his guard corps, against Emperor Gaozu's regulations. When this was revealed to Emperor Gaozu, Emperor Gaozu rebuked Li Jiancheng and exiled his guard commander Keda Zhi (可達志). When, subsequently, Li Jiancheng nevertheless requested the commandant at Qing Prefecture (慶州, in modern Qingyang, Gansu), Yang Wen'gan (楊文幹), to conscript troops, presumably to guard against Li Shimin, the officers Erzhu Huan (爾朱煥) and Qiao Gongshan (橋公山) informed Emperor Gaozu that Li Jiancheng was encouraging Yang to start a rebellion so that they could seize power together. Emperor Gaozu, then at Renzhi Palace (仁智宮, in modern Tongchuan, Shaanxi), was incensed, and summoned Li Jiancheng, then at Chang'an, to Renzhi Palace. Li Jiancheng briefly flirted the idea of occupying Chang'an and not accepting the order, but eventually reported to Renzhi Palace to request forgiveness. Emperor Gaozu put him under arrest. When Yang heard this, Yang rebelled, and Emperor Gaozu, after promising Li Shimin that he would be made crown prince, sent Li Shimin to attack Yang. (Under Emperor Gaozu's promise, Li Jiancheng would be removed as crown prince and created the Prince of Shu instead. He would then send Li Jiancheng to the modern Sichuan region.) Once Li Shimin left, however, Li Yuanji, Emperor Gaozu's concubines, and the chancellor Feng Deyi, all spoke on Li Jiancheng's behalf, and Emperor Gaozu changed his mind, released Li Jiancheng, and allowed him to return to Chang'an and remain as crown prince. Instead, Emperor Gaozu only blamed the discord between his sons on Li Jiancheng's staff members Wang Gui and Wei Ting (韋挺), and Li Shimin's staff member Du Yan, exiling them. Yang was subsequently assassinated by his own subordinates.

Later that year, Emperor Gaozu, troubled by repeated Eastern Tujue incursions, seriously considered burning Chang'an to the ground and moving the capital to Fancheng (樊城, in modern Xiangfan, Hubei), a suggestion that Li Jiancheng, Li Yuanji, and the chancellor Pei Ji agreed with. Li Shimin opposed, however, and the plan was not carried out. Meanwhile, Li Shimin himself was sending his confidants to Luoyang to build up personal control of the army there. After an incident in which Li Shimin suffered a severe case of food poisoning after feasting at Li Jiancheng's palace—an event that both Emperor Gaozu and Li Shimin apparently interpreted as an assassination attempt—Emperor Gaozu considered sending Li Shimin to guard Luoyang to prevent further conflict, but Li Jiancheng and Li Yuanji, after consulting each other, believed that this would only give Li Shimin an opportunity to build up his personal power there, and therefore opposed it. Emperor Gaozu therefore did not carry out the plan.

== Death ==
By 626, Li Shimin was fearful that he would be killed by Li Jiancheng, and his staff members Fang Xuanling, Du Ruhui, and Zhangsun Wuji were repeatedly encouraging Li Shimin to attack Li Jiancheng and Li Yuanji first—while Wei Zheng was encouraging Li Jiancheng to attack Li Shimin first. Li Jiancheng persuaded Emperor Gaozu to remove Fang and Du, as well as Li Shimin's trusted guard officers Yuchi Gong and Cheng Zhijie (程知節), from Li Shimin's staff. Zhangsun, who remained on Li Shimin's staff, continued to try to persuade Li Shimin to attack first.

In summer 626, Eastern Tujue was making another attack, and under Li Jiancheng's suggestion, Emperor Gaozu, instead of sending Li Shimin to resist Eastern Tujue as he first was inclined, decided to send Li Yuanji instead. Li Yuanji was given command of much of the army previously under Li Shimin's control, further troubling Li Shimin, who believed that with the army in Li Yuanji's hands, he would be unable to resist an attack. Li Shimin had Yuchi summon Fang and Du back to his mansion secretly, and then on one night submitted an accusation to Emperor Gaozu that Li Jiancheng and Li Yuanji were committing adultery with Emperor Gaozu's concubines. Emperor Gaozu, in response, issued summonses to Li Jiancheng and Li Yuanji for the next morning, convening the senior officials Pei Ji, Xiao Yu, and Chen Shuda to examine Li Shimin's accusations. As Li Jiancheng and Li Yuanji approached the central gate leading to Emperor Gaozu's palace, Xuanwu Gate (玄武門), Li Shimin carried out the ambush he had set. He personally fired an arrow that killed Li Jiancheng. Subsequently, Li Yuanji tried to kill Li Shimin, but Yuchi killed Li Yuanji instead during the struggle. Li Shimin's forces entered the palace and, under the intimidation of Li Shimin's forces, Emperor Gaozu agreed to create Li Shimin crown prince, and two months later passed the throne to him (as Emperor Taizong). Li Yuanji's five sons were all executed as well. Emperor Taizong also took Li Yuanji's wife Princess Yang as a concubine.

Li Yuanji was initially posthumously reduced to commoner rank. After Emperor Taizong took the throne, he posthumously created Li Yuanji the Prince of Hailing, with the unflattering posthumous name of La (meaning "ungrateful"). In 642, Emperor Taizong changed Li Yuanji's posthumous title to the greater title of Prince of Chao, and adopted his own son, by Consort Yang (Li Yuanji's widow), Li Ming (李明) the Prince of Cao (note difference in title) into Li Yuanji's line, as Li Yuanji's heir.

== Family ==
Consort and their respective issue(s):

- Princess Consort, of the Yang clan of Hongnong (王妃 弘農楊氏), (Note: married Li Shimin after Li Yuanji's death and had a son with Shimin) niece of Yang Gongren
  - Princess of Xinye County (新野县主, 624–662), personal name Ling (令), 6th daughter
    - Married Pei Chonghun of Hedong (河东 裴重晖), in 638, and had issue (two daughters)
- Concubine, of a certain clan (某姬)
  - Princess of Guiren County (归仁县主, 625 – 17 September 668), 2nd daughter
    - Married the second son of Jiang Mo of Tianshui, Duke of Changdao County (长道县公 天水 姜謩), in 644
- Unknown
  - Li Chengye, Prince of Liang Commandery (梁郡王 李承业), 1st son
  - Li Chengluan, Prince of Yuyang (渔阳王 李承鸾), 2nd son
  - Li Chengjiang, Prince of Pu'an (普安王 李承奖), 3rd son
  - Li Chengyu, Prince of Jiangxia (江夏王 李承裕, 4th son
  - Li Chengdu, Prince of Yiyang (义阳王 李承度), 5th son
  - Princess of Wen'an County (文安县主; b. 623–648), 1st daughter
    - Married Duan Yan (段俨)
  - Princess of Hejing County (和静县主), 3rd daughter
    - Married Xue Yuanchao, Baron of Fenyin (汾陰男 薛元超), and had issue (three sons)
  - Princess of Shouchun County (寿春县主), 4th daughter
    - Married Yang Yuzhi (杨豫之), son of Yang Shidao

== Popular culture ==
- Portrayed by Im Chae-hong in 2006-2007 SBS TV series Yeon Gaesomun.

== Notes and references ==
- Old Book of Tang, vol. 64.
- New Book of Tang, vol. 79.
- Zizhi Tongjian, vols. 183, 184, 185, 187, 188, 189, 190, 191, 192.
