= Ma Sanbao (Tang dynasty) =

- Born: 585? Xinzhou
- Died: 629 (aged 43–44); Chang'an
- Occupation: General
- Era: Tang dynasty

Ma Sanbao (Chinese: 马三宝) was a Chinese general during the Tang dynasty. He played an important role in the establishment of the Tang dynasty.

== In history ==
Ma Sanbao was initially a servant of Chai Shao, the husband of Li Yuan's daughter Princess Pingyang. He was good at training eagles and hounds. When Li Yuan rebelled against the Sui dynasty in 617 in Taiyuan, Chai Shao and Pingyang were chased by Sui officials. To avoid being both captured, they split and ran separate ways. Chai Shao fled to Taiyuan, while Ma Sanbao stayed with and protected Pingyang. They went to Sizhuyuan and convinced a local armed force led by He Panren, a bandit, to join forces with them. They then launched their own uprising near Chang'an to remotely assist Li Yuan's main force. Other small rebellion forces led by Li Zhongwen, Xiang Shanzhi, and Qiu Shili joined forces with them, and they managed to capture smaller cities around Chang'an such as Zhouzhi, Shiping, and Wugong. Sui forces in Chang'an tried to attack Ma Sanbao but were defeated. When Li Yuan's main force arrived, Pingyang and Ma Sanbao had already cleared most Sui garrisons around Chang'an. Then, Ma Sanbao joined forces with Li Shimin and captured Chang'an successfully. He also defeated another group of rebels led by barbarians north of the city.

After Tang dynasty was officially established, Ma Sanbao participated in campaigns against Xue Renguo and Tuyuhun as a subordinate to Chai Shao. He was known for his bravery on the battlefield. In the battle at Minzhou, he killed a prince of Tuyuhun and captured thousands of enemy soldiers. For those achievements, Li Yuan granted him the title of Baron of Xinxing County. When Li Shimin became the emperor, he appointed Ma Sanbao to be the Grand General of Left Brave Guard, and promoted Ma's title to Duke of Xinxing County. Ma Sanbao died in 629 and was given a posthumous name of Zhong (Chinese: 忠; lit. 'loyal').

== In popular culture ==
In folklores, Ma Sanbao is often written as 马三保 (same romanization but different Chinese characters). He was said to be the general guarding the fortress of Wagang during Sui dynasty. He was defeated by Cheng Yaojin, who at that time was a general in the rebellion Wagang Army. After that, Ma Sanbao joined Tang army and became one of four close guards protecting Li Shimin (along with Duan Zhixuan, Yin Kaishan and Liu Hongji). In a battle against Goguryeo, Ma Sanbao was killed by Korean general Yŏn Kaesomun.
