= Battle of Qianshuiyuan =

618 AD battle between the Chinese states of Qin and Tang

- Part of the transition from Sui to Tang
- Map of the situation in China during the transition from the Sui to the Tang, with the main contenders for the throne and the main military operations
Date	29 November 618
Location	Qianshuiyuan (northwest of present-day Changwu, Shaanxi)
Result	Tang victory: End of Qin

Belligerents
Tang dynasty	Qin

Commanders and leaders
Li Shimin; Liu Wenjing; Yin Kaishan; Qutu Tong; Du Ruhui; Yu Zhining; Zhangsun Wuji; Dou Kang; Chai Shao; Pang Yu (龐玉); Dou Gui (竇軌)	Xue Rengao (executed); Chu Suiliang (surrendered); Zong Luohou (executed); Zhai Zhangsun (surrendered)

The Battle of Qianshuiyuan (Chinese: 淺水原之戰), northwest of present-day Changwu, Shaanxi, was fought in 618 between the Tang dynasty and the Qin state founded by Xue Rengao. The battle ended in victory for the Tang, whose armed forces were led by the future Tang emperor Li Shimin.

== Background ==
In 618 AD, Xue Ju, who occupied Longxi and made Tianshui his capital, styled himself as the Qin emperor (秦帝). He possessed an army of 300,000 soldiers and intended to capture Chang'an.

== Battle ==
In 618 AD, Emperor Gaozu of Tang appointed Li Shimin as the marshal to meet the Qin forces head-on. At first, they were defeated in Qianshuiyuan and were forced back to Chang'an. Gaozhi (高墌) was annexed. After Xue Ju's death, his son Xue Rengao succeeded to the throne and continued to attack the Tang army. Li Yuan tried to get support from Li Gui, who occupied Liangzhou (in present-day Wuwei, Gansu), and he ordered Li Shimin to press on towards Gaozhi at the same time. Xue Rengao dispatched his elite general Zong Luohou (宗羅睺), leading more than 100,000 soldiers to resist. Li Shimin thought the Tang army was frustrated while the enemies were inspiring. So he switched from attacking to defending. The two sides were locked in a stalemate for about 60 days. When the Xue army were short of provisions, Li Shimin took great advantage of physical features of Qianshuiyuan and started attacking. Finally, the Xue army was badly defeated and surrendered. The Tang dynasty suppressed Longxi and ensured the safety of Guanzhong.

== Sources ==
- Wang, Zhenping. "Ideas concerning Diplomacy and Foreign Policy under the Tang Emperors Gaozu and Taizong" (PDF). Institute of History & Philology, Academia Sinica.
