= Li Jiancheng =

- Crown Prince of the Tang dynasty
- Born: 589
- Died: July 2, 626 (aged 37); Xuanwu Gate, Chang'an, Tang China
Names
- Lǐ Jiànchéng (李建成)
Posthumous name
- Crown Prince Yin (隱太子)
- House: House of Li
- Father: Emperor Gaozu of Tang
- Mother: Empress Taimu

Li Jiancheng (Chinese: 李建成; pinyin: Lǐ Jiànchéng; 589 – July 2, 626), posthumous name Crown Prince Yin (隱太子), childhood nickname Vaishravana (毗沙門), was the first crown prince of the Chinese Tang dynasty. He was the oldest son of the founding emperor Emperor Gaozu (Li Yuan) and the crown prince after the founding of the dynasty in 618 CE.

Li Jiancheng was murdered by his younger brother, Tang general Li Shimin, the Prince of Qin, in the Xuanwu Gate Incident on July 2 626, in which Li Shimin seized control of the imperial government and forced their father Emperor Gaozu to abdicate. Li Jiancheng's sons were subsequently executed or excluded from the imperial clan. After Li Shimin took the throne, Li Jiancheng was posthumously stripped of his crown prince status and granted the title "Prince Yin of Xi" (息隐王). Later, he was buried with the ceremonies due to an imperial prince. On 9 July 642, Li Jiancheng's title of crown prince was restored; his posthumous name then became Crown Prince Yin (隐太子).

== Background ==
Li Jiancheng was born in 589 during the reign of Emperor Wen of Sui. He was the oldest son of Li Yuan, then Duke of Tang, who was a hereditary noble, and Li Yuan's wife Duchess Dou, who was the daughter of Dou Yi (竇毅), the Duke of Shenwu and Northern Zhou's Princess Xiangyang. Duchess Dou would subsequently give birth to three of Li Jiancheng's younger brothers: Li Shimin, Li Xuanba (李玄霸, who died in 614), and Li Yuanji. She also gave birth to a girl who eventually became Princess Pingyang, although it is not clear whether she was older or younger than Li Jiancheng. In December 617 or January 618, Li Jiancheng received the title of Heir apparent of Tang. (Note: Emperor Gaozu's biography in the Old Book of Tang recorded that on 20 December 617, Li Jiancheng was made crown prince of the princedom of Tang. The Zizhi Tongjian gave a date of 25 December 617, while Emperor Gaozu's biography in the New Book of Tang recorded a date of 8 Jan 618.)

== Participation in Tang's founding ==
=== The rebellion against Sui rule ===
In 616, with rebellions beginning to engulf northern China and frequent Eastern Tujue incursions across the border, Emperor Yang of Sui commissioned Li Yuan to be the commander of Taiyuan, guarding it against both rebels and the Eastern Tujue. As the chief commander of Taiyuan, Li Yuan was obligated by law to leave his family behind. Li Jiancheng was therefore put in charge of the estate and became the head of the house of Hedong (河東, in modern Yuncheng, Shanxi) while Li Yuan was away. Li Yuan took his younger son Li Shimin with him to the city Jinyang, which was the administrative center of Taiyuan.

According to the traditional narrative in the official historical records, in 617 Li Yuan was persuaded by Li Shimin to rebel against Sui rule (see "Historical sources" below). Another source, Wen Daya's (溫大雅) Da Tang Chuangye Qijuzhu (大唐創業起居注), attributes the decision to revolt to Li Yuan himself. When Li Yuan was initially assigned to Jinyang in 616, he was pleased and regarded his assignment as a divinely-granted opportunity. But just one year later, in 617, Li Yuan said to Li Shimin: "The Sui Empire is about to collapse and the next family to rule this country will be us. The only reason I haven't yet started a rebellion is because your brothers are still in Hedong". Li Yuan sent secret messengers to Hedong to transfer his family to Jinyang. During the journey one of Li Jiancheng's younger brothers, Li Zhiyun, died. He also summoned his son-in-law Chai Shao from Chang'an. At the urging of Li Yuan's daughter, Chai Shao left Chang'an on his own while she went into hiding.

Even before Li Jiancheng, Li Yuanji, and Chai Shao arrived at Jinyang, Li Yuan rebelled, declaring that he intended to support Emperor Yang's grandson Yang You, the Prince of Dai, as emperor, while honoring Emperor Yang as Taishang Huang (retired emperor). Yang You was nominally in charge of the capital city Chang'an at the time.

Li Yuan made both Li Jiancheng and Li Shimin key generals, and in nine days they captured Xihe Commandery (西河, roughly modern Lüliang, Shanxi), impressing their father. Subsequently, Li Yuan divided his forces into six armies, giving Li Jiancheng and Li Shimin command of three armies each. He also made Li Jiancheng the Duke of Longxi and Li Shimin the Duke of Dunhuang. Li Yuan then advanced toward Chang'an. As he approached Hedong, torrential rains prevented his army from advancing further. With rumors running rampant that Liu Wuzhou and the Eastern Tujue were about to attack Taiyuan, Li Yuan initially ordered a retreat back to Taiyuan. However, Li Jiancheng and Li Shimin argued that this would mean sure defeat, and Li Yuan changed his mind.

Li Jiancheng and Li Shimin then captured the fortress of Huoyi (霍邑, in modern Linfen, Shanxi), eventually convincing Li Yuan to bypass Hedong and directly advance toward Chang'an. After he crossed the Yellow River into Guanzhong (i.e., the Chang'an region), he sent Li Jiancheng with Liu Wenjing (劉文靜) east to guard Tong Pass and Yongfeng Storage (永豐倉) and to stop any potential Sui reinforcements from the eastern capital Luoyang. He also sent Li Shimin north of the Wei River to seize territory. Once Li Yuan himself approached Chang'an, he summoned both Li Jiancheng and Li Shimin to join him in a siege of Chang'an. On 19 December 617, Li Yuan captured Chang'an and declared Yang You emperor (as Emperor Gong). He was created Prince of Tang on 20 December, and became the regent for Yang You.

In the spring of 618, Li Yuan sent Li Jiancheng and Li Shimin toward Luoyang, which was then under attack by the rebel leader Li Mi, Duke of Wei, ostensibly to help the Sui forces there. The Sui forces rejected the overture, and Li Jiancheng and Li Shimin returned to Chang'an.

=== Tang imperial reunification ===
Later in the spring of 618, Emperor Yang, then at Jiangdu (江都, in modern Yangzhou, Jiangsu), was killed in a coup led by the general Yuwen Huaji. When this news arrived at Chang'an, Li Yuan had Yang You yield the throne to him. He established the Tang dynasty, and declared himself emperor. He also made Li Jiancheng crown prince on 4 July.

In 619, Li Yuan sent Li Jiancheng to attack the peasant rebel leader Zhu Shanhai (祝山海), the Duke of Huxiang. Li Jiancheng defeated Zhu. Later that year Li Gui, the Emperor of Liang, was captured in a coup by his official An Xinggui (安興貴), who then surrendered to Tang. Li Yuan sent Li Jiancheng to welcome An and to escort Li Gui to Chang'an, where An was executed by Li Yuan.

Meanwhile, Li Jiancheng was developing a reputation for leniency but was addicted to drinking and hunting. Li Yuan was worried that he was ignorant about politics and uninterested in working for the state. He added his key ministers Li Gang (李綱) and Zheng Shanguo (鄭善果) to Li Jiancheng's staff.

=== Campaigns against Tujue ===
On July 1, 620, Li Shimin was sent to fight Wang Shichong. In the fall of 620, reports came in that Li Zhongwen (李仲文), who was then in charge at Taiyuan, was planning to rebel. Li Yuan sent Li Jiancheng to Pufan (蒲反, i.e., Hedong) to guard against Li Zhongwen, while summoning Li Zhongwen back to the capital. Li Zhongwen complied and was later executed.

In spring 621 the Xiongnu chieftain Liu Xiancheng (劉仚成) harassed Tang's border territory. Li Yuan sent Li Jiancheng to attack Liu. Li Jiancheng captured a number of the Xiongnu and released their leaders. This led them to surrender in large numbers, and he then massacred them. Only Liu escaped and fled to Liang Shidu, the Emperor of Liang. In 622, Li Jiancheng was one of the commanders that Li Yuan sent, along with Li Shimin, Li Zihe (李子和), and Duan Decao (段德操), to counter an Eastern Tujue incursion.

== Rivalry with Li Shimin ==
Meanwhile, an intense rivalry had developed between Li Jiancheng and Li Shimin, who now carried the title Prince of Qin. Although Li Jiancheng had made contributions towards Tang's reunification of China, Li Shimin had defeated a number of the most important contenders including Xue Rengao, the Emperor of Qin, Wang Shichong, the Emperor of Zheng, and Dou Jiande, the Prince of Xia. Li Shimin therefore had a stronger reputation in the army. Li Yuanji was also often relied on by Li Yuan as a general and had been created the Prince of Qi. He supported Li Jiancheng in his rivalry with Li Shimin, and often pushed Li Jiancheng toward a more hard-line position, wanting to be crown prince when Li Jiancheng became emperor. Li Jiancheng and Li Yuanji had better relations with Li Yuan's favored young concubines than Li Shimin did (their mother Duchess Dou had died before Tang's establishment), and those concubines helped rehabilitate Li Jiancheng's standing before Li Yuan. Li Yuan had considered making Li Shimin crown prince instead of Li Jiancheng, but his concubines persuaded him not to.

By winter 622, the only remaining major threat against Tang rule was Liu Heita, the Prince of Handong. He had been a Xia general, and rose against Tang after Li Yuan had executed Dou Jiande. He had been defeated by Li Shimin earlier in the year. Li Jiancheng's staff members Wang Gui and Wei Zheng argued to him that he needed some victories to establish his reputation, and Li Jiancheng volunteered to command the army against Liu Heita. Li Yuan sent Li Jiancheng to attack Liu, assisted by Li Yuanji. Around the turn of the year, Liu's forces were bogged down while attacking Tang's Wei Prefecture (魏州, in modern Handan, Hebei). Li Jiancheng and Li Yuanji engaged him at Guantao, crushing him. Liu fled north toward the Eastern Tujue, but was ambushed and captured by his own official Zhuge Dewei (諸葛德威), who delivered him to Li Jiancheng. Li Jiancheng executed Liu. China was by this point almost completely unified by Tang.

In 623, when the Eastern Tujue made another incursion into Tang territory, Li Yuan again sent Li Jiancheng and Li Shimin to guard against the attack. Meanwhile, Li Yuanji suggested to Li Jiancheng that he could have Li Shimin assassinated when Li Shimin was visiting Li Yuanji's mansion, but Li Jiancheng refused, not having the heart to kill a brother.

In 624, Li Jiancheng requisitioned a number of soldiers from the general Li Yi, the Prince of Yan, to supplement his guard corps. This was against Li Yuan's regulations. Li Yuan rebuked Li Jiancheng when he found out, and exiled his guard commander Keda Zhi (可達志). Nevertheless, Li Jiancheng later requested the commandant at Qing Prefecture (慶州, in modern Qingyang, Gansu), Yang Wen'gan (楊文幹) to conscript troops, presumably to guard against Li Shimin. The officers Erzhu Huan (爾朱煥) and Qiao Gongshan (橋公山) informed Li Yuan that Li Jiancheng was encouraging Yang to start a rebellion so that they could seize power together. Li Yuan, then at Renzhi Palace (仁智宮, in modern Tongchuan, Shaanxi), was incensed, and summoned Li Jiancheng, then at Chang'an, to Renzhi Palace. Li Jiancheng briefly flirted with the idea of occupying Chang'an instead of accepting the order, but eventually reported to Renzhi Palace to request forgiveness. Li Yuan put him under arrest. When Yang heard this, Yang rebelled, and Li Yuan sent Li Shimin to attack Yang. Li Yuan promised Li Shimin that he would replace Li Jiancheng as crown prince, and that Li Jiancheng would be sent to the modern Sichuan region as the Prince of Shu. After Li Shimin left, however, Li Yuanji, Li Yuan's concubines, and the chancellor Feng Deyi, all spoke on Li Jiancheng's behalf, and Li Yuan changed his mind, released Li Jiancheng, and allowed him to return to Chang'an as crown prince. Li Yuan then blamed the discord between his sons on Li Jiancheng's staff members Wang Gui and Wei Ting (韋挺), and Li Shimin's staff member Du Yan, exiling them. Yang was subsequently assassinated by his own subordinates.

Later that year, Li Yuan, troubled by repeated Eastern Tujue incursions, seriously considered burning Chang'an to the ground and moving the capital to Fancheng, a suggestion that Li Jiancheng, Li Yuanji, and the chancellor Pei Ji agreed with. Li Shimin opposed the plan, however, and it was not carried out. Meanwhile, Li Shimin sent his confidants to Luoyang to build up personal control of the army there.

=== The Poisoned Wine at Eastern Palace ===
According to Zizhi Tongjian, on the first day of the 6th lunar month of 626, three days before the Xuanwu Gate incident, Li Jiancheng hosted a banquet for Li Shimin and Li Yuanji at his residence, the Eastern Palace. Li Shimin was carried back home after a night of drinking. Li Shimin reported through officials at his residence that he started vomiting a lot of blood after returning home. (Note: The direct translation is "several (Chinese) Liters". 4 Chinese Liters during the Sui-Tang era is equivalent to 1 Liter (or 2.1 pints) today. So, Li Shimin vomited no less than 1 liter of blood based on today's unit system after drinking. A human body has 5 liters of blood in total.) Li Yuan sent a royal decree to Li Jiancheng: "The prince of Qin (Li Shimin) has a low alcohol tolerance, therefore, he is forbidden to go out drinking at night." Li Shimin apparently interpreted the wine as an assassination attempt, but Li Yuan did not mention poison in his decree to Li Jiancheng. Li Yuan considered sending Li Shimin to guard Luoyang to prevent further conflict, but Li Jiancheng and Li Yuanji opposed the plan because they believed that this would give Li Shimin an opportunity to build up his personal power. They expressed their concerns to Li Yuan's ministers, who explained to him that this plan could escalate a brotherly rivalry into a civil conflict. Li Yuan therefore did not carry out the plan.

The date and the veracity of this event are both disputed. According to Zizhi Tongjian, it happened 3 days before the Xuanwu Gate incident. In Li Jiancheng's biography from the Old Book of Tang and the New Book of Tang, it took place after the Yang Wen'gan incident but several months before the Xuanwu Gate incident. However, in Fang Xuanling's biography from the Old Book of Tang, it happened before the founding of Tang, and wine was not mentioned. It remains a mystery whether or not someone attempted to poison Li Shimin at the Eastern Palace. (Note: Historian Meng Xianshi (孟憲實) commented on "the Poisoned Wine" incident in CCTV's documentary "The Xuanwu Gate Incident": "If Li Jiancheng attempted to murder Li Shimin at his own residence by poisoning, it must be badly done since the target was still alive. This obvious move could only make Li Yuan angry. It would also be difficult for Li Yuanji to carry out the plan since he was only a guest at a banquet in East Palace. Moreover, if it were found out, especially in this case the target did not die, it would break his political line with Li Jiancheng.")

== Death ==
By 626, Li Shimin was fearful that he would be killed by Li Jiancheng, and his staff members Fang Xuanling, Du Ruhui, and Zhangsun Wuji were encouraging Li Shimin to attack Li Jiancheng and Li Yuanji first. Similarly, Wei Zheng was encouraging Li Jiancheng to attack Li Shimin first. Li Jiancheng persuaded Li Yuan to remove Fang and Du, as well as Li Shimin's trusted guard officers Yuchi Gong and Cheng Zhijie (程知節), from Li Shimin's staff. Zhangsun, who remained on Li Shimin's staff, continued to try to persuade Li Shimin to attack first.

In summer 626, the Eastern Tujue were making another attack. Li Yuan was initially inclined to send Li Shimin to resist them, but at Li Jiancheng's suggestion sent Li Yuanji instead. Li Yuanji was given command of much of the army previously under Li Shimin's control. This further troubled Li Shimin, who believed that with the army in Li Yuanji's hands he would be unable to resist an attack. Li Shimin had Yuchi secretly summon Fang and Du back to his mansion, then sent an accusation to Li Yuan that Li Jiancheng and Li Yuanji were committing adultery with Li Yuan's concubines. Li Yuan responded by issuing summonses to Li Jiancheng and Li Yuanji for the next morning, convening the senior officials Pei Ji, Xiao Yu, and Chen Shuda to examine Li Shimin's accusations. As Li Jiancheng and Li Yuanji approached the central gate leading to Li Yuan's palace, Xuanwu Gate (玄武門), Li Shimin ambushed them. He personally fired the arrow that killed Li Jiancheng, and Yuchi killed Li Yuanji. Li Shimin's forces entered the palace and, under this intimidation, Li Yuan agreed to make Li Shimin crown prince. Two months later, Li Shimin succeeded to the throne. Li Jiancheng's five sons were all executed.

Li Jiancheng was initially reduced to commoner rank. After Emperor Taizong took the throne, he posthumously granted Li Jiancheng the title of Prince of Xi and assigned his own son Li Fu (李福) into Li Jiancheng's lineage as Li Jiancheng's heir. He also buried Li Jiancheng with the ceremonies due to an imperial prince. In July 642, he restored Li Jiancheng's crown prince title. However, Li Jiancheng was never fully rehabilitated and his daughters still had the status of daughters of a common prince, rather than a crown prince.

== Historical sources ==
=== Da Tang Chuangye Qijuzhu ===
"Qijuzhu" is a type of imperial diary which records the emperor's daily activities that appeared as early as the Han dynasty. The purpose of Qijuzhu is to help govern the emperor's behavior by faithfully recording the actions and words of the Emperor in court. The emperor must not read or ask about the Qijuzhu. In the Tang dynasty, imperial diarists were in charge of the Qijuzhu. According to convention, the Qijuzhu should be edited and the original diary destroyed after the death of the emperor.

The author of Da Tang Chuangye Qijuzhu (大唐创业起居注, "Imperial diary of the foundation of the Great Tang") was Wen Daya (c. 572 – 629 CE; elder brother of Wen Yanbo). He served as Li Yuan's staff of records and witnessed the establishment of Tang dynasty in 618. Da Tang Chuangye Qijuzhu was a three-chapter book with a detailed narrative and a firsthand account of the 357 days of insurrection. His work was finished before Li Shimin began censoring the official imperial records. Since Wen Daya was a supporter of Li Shimin, (Note: Wen Daya's biography (《旧唐书·温大雅传》) is in vol.61 of the Old Book of Tang) he did not feel a need to exaggerate Li Jiancheng's contribution to Tang's founding. As the only complete original court diary left from pre-Qing times, Da Tang Chuangye Qijuzhu is now generally considered a more reliable source on early Tang Dynasty.

Da Tang Chuangye Qijuzhu emphasizes that Li Yuan was the mastermind of the revolt against the Sui. Li Shimin, who was a teenager at the time, served only a secondary role in these events. In the official histories, Li Jiancheng was described as an incompetent crown prince. Wen Daya portrayed a different Li Jiancheng: a capable leader, generous and open-minded. He knew how to recruit talented people and did well in his early political career as a crown prince. Li Yuan, in Wen Daya's narrative, was a fearless leader with vision, courage and strategic planning.

Contemporary historians have re-examined the evidence for events contained in the official histories (the Old Book of Tang, the New Book of Tang and Zizhi Tongjian) and have concluded that important elements were probably fabricated during the reign of Li Shimin at his order. On the basis of other material, most importantly Da-Tang Chuangye Qijuzhu, historians have been able to correct some of the bias and distortions of the official histories about the founding of the Tang dynasty. Da Tang Chuangye Qijuzhu provides a clear example of how Li Shimin rewritten history for his own favor. It also explains Li Jiancheng's historical image contradictions in the official histories. The truth that had intentionally been distorted and ignored by later official historians can be found in the Da Tang Chuangye Qijuzhu.

== Family ==
Consort and issue(s)

- Crown Princess, of the Zheng clan (太子妃 郑氏, 599 – 19 February 676), personal name Guanyin (观音)
  - Li Chengzong, Prince of Taiyuan (太原郡王 李承宗), 1st son
  - Li Chengdao, Prince of Anlu (安陆郡王 李承道, d. 626), 2nd son
  - Li Chengde, Prince of Hedong (河东郡王 李承德,d. 626), 3rd son
  - Li Chengxun, Prince of Wu'an (武安郡王 李承训, d. 626), 4th son
  - Princess Guide (归德县主), 5th daughter
  - Li Chengming, Prince of Runan (汝南郡王 李承明, d. 626), 5th son
  - Li Chengyi, Prince of Julu (钜鹿郡王 李承义, d. 626), 6th son
- Chenghui, of the Yang clan (承徽 杨氏, 598 – 28 December 668), personal name Sheniang (舍娘)
  - Princess Leling (乐陵县主), 3rd daughter
    - Married Yu Shanxun (于善询)
- Unknown
  - First Daughter
  - Princess Wenxi (闻喜县主, 622 – 8 July 661), personal name Wanshun (婉順), 2nd daughter
    - Married Liu Yingdao (刘应道), a son of Liu Linfu (刘林甫), and had issue
  - Fourth Daughter

== Tombstone inscription ==
Li Jiancheng's tombstone was lost for many years. It was recovered in 2013, and the inscription was released to the public on June 8, 2013.

There are 55 characters in total, as follows: “大唐故息隐王墓志。王讳建成。武德九年六月四日薨于京师。粤于贞观二年岁次戊子正月已酉朔十三日辛酉。葬于雍州长安县之高阳原。”

== Modern depictions ==
- Portrayed by Yan Yikuan in the 2005 TV series The Prince of Qin, Li Shimin.
- Portrayed by Choi Jung-woo in 2006–2007 SBS TV series Yeon Gaesomun.
- Portrayed by Qiao Zhenyu in the 2012 TV series Heroes of Sui and Tang Dynasties.
- Portrayed by Han Dong in the upcoming CCTV TV series Peace in Palace, Peace in Chang'An.
