= Chen Shuda =

Chinese writer and chancellor

Chen Shuda 陳叔達
- Born: 572; Huzhou, Zhejiang, Chen China
- Died: 635; Xi'an, Shaanxi, Tang China
- Other names: Zicong (子聰); Duke Zhong of Jiang (江忠公)
- Occupation: Statesman
- Spouse: Wang Nüjie
- Children: Chen Zhengde; Chen Xuande; Chen Xiande; Chen Shaode; Chen Bi
- Parents: Emperor Xuan of Chen (father); Consort Yuan (mother)

Chen Shuda (572–635), courtesy name Zicong, formally Duke Zhong of Jiang, was an imperial prince of the Chen dynasty, who, after the destruction of Chen, served as an official under the Sui and Tang dynasties, becoming a chancellor during the reigns of the Tang emperors Gaozu and Taizong.

== During Chen dynasty ==
Chen Shuda was born in 572. (Note: His elder brother Chen Shushen was born in 572, and his younger brothers Chen Shu'ao and Chen Shuxing had a common mother while Chen Shuxing was born in 573.) He was the 17th of 42 sons of Emperor Xuan of Chen. (Note: That Chen Shuda was Emperor Xuan's 17th son was per the Book of Chen and the History of Southern Dynasties, although the Old Book of Tang indicated that he was the 16th son. The New Book of Tang avoided the issue by merely stating that he was a son of Emperor Xuan.) His mother was Consort Yuan, a concubine of Emperor Xuan who carried the rank of Zhaorong (昭容), the eighth highest rank among imperial consorts, who had two other sons—his older brother Chen Shuwen (陳叔文), later created the Prince of Jinxi, and his younger brother Chen Shutan (陳叔坦), later created the Prince of Xinhui.

In 582, just after Emperor Xuan died and was succeeded by Chen Shuda's oldest brother Chen Shubao the Crown Prince, Chen Shubao created Chen Shuda, along with his other brothers Chen Shuyan (陳叔儼), Chen Shushen (陳叔慎), and Chen Shuyu (陳叔虞), princes, and Chen Shuda's title was Prince of Yiyang. Chen Shuda was also given a minor general title. In 587, Chen Shubao made him the mayor of the capital Jiankang. During Chen Shubao's reign, Chen Shuda was one of the officials known for literary talent, and Chen Shubao often invited him, along with those other officials, into the palace to feast, write poems, and recite them with him and some of the concubines with literary talent as well. Once, he impressed the chancellor Xu Ling (徐陵) by writing a poem that had 10 rhymes during a feast.

== During Sui dynasty ==
In 589, the Sui dynasty conquered the Chen dynasty, reuniting China proper. Chen Shubao and the rest of the Chen imperial clan, other than Chen Shushen, who continued to resist after Chen Shubao surrendered and who was executed after being captured, were treated well by Emperor Wen of Sui after they were taken to the Sui capital Chang'an. Chen Shuda entered Sui governmental service as a minor official, although his title at the time is not recorded in history. During the reign of Emperor Wen's son Emperor Yang, he was made Neishi Sheren (內史舍人), a mid-level official at the legislative bureau of the government (內史省, Neishi Sheng), and later the deputy governor of Jiang Commandery (絳郡, part of modern Yuncheng, Shanxi), acting as governor.

In 617, the Sui general Li Yuan the Duke of Tang rebelled at Taiyuan and advanced toward Chang'an. When his army arrived at Jiang Commandery, Chen Shuda surrendered the commandery to his forces, and he was made a secretary on Li Yuan's staff and created the Duke of Handong, sharing important secretarial duties with Wen Daya (溫大雅). It was said that Li Yuan's military correspondences, as well as edicts later issued in the name of Yang You (the grandson of Emperor Yang, whom Li Yuan declared emperor after capturing Chang'an later in 617) announcing general pardons and, later, passing the throne to Li Yuan in 618, were largely written by Chen Shuda.

== During Emperor Gaozu's reign ==
After Li Yuan assumed the throne in 618 (posthumously remembered as Emperor Gaozu) and established the Tang dynasty, Chen Shuda was made the Huangmen Shilang (黃門侍郎), the deputy head of the Chancellery. In 619, Emperor Gaozu made him Nayan (納言), then the head of the Chancellery and a position with default chancellor status. In 621, he continued to serve as head of the Chancellery after the position was renamed Palace Attendant.

It was said that Chen was well-spoken and handsome in appearance, and whenever he made an appearance before the emperor, the gentlemen at the capital were all looking at him. When famed people from south of the Yangtze River (i.e., the former Chen territory) visited Chang'an, he often recommended them for government service. In 630, Emperor Gaozu created him the greater title of Duke of Jiang. At one imperial feast, when grapes were served, Chen, instead of eating the grapes, held them in his hand, and when Emperor Gaozu asked him why, he responded, "My mother has a mouth ailment, and I have wanted to get her grapes but could not get them. (Note: At that time, grapes appeared to be an imported delicacy, grown in the modern Xinjiang region, then out of Tang's control.) I want to hold them and take them back to my mother." Emperor Gaozu, who thus was reminded of his mother, stated, "It is a good thing you have a mother to take things back to." He rewarded Chen with silk.

Late in Emperor Gaozu's reign, an intense rivalry developed between his two oldest sons, Li Jiancheng the Crown Prince and Li Shimin the Prince of Qin, as Li Jiancheng, while a capable general himself, was overshadowed by Li Shimin, who had destroyed Tang's major enemies Xue Rengao the Emperor of Qin, Liu Wuzhou the Dingyang Khan, Wang Shichong the Emperor of Zheng, and Dou Jiande the Prince of Xia. Li Jiancheng and a brother who supported him, Li Yuanji the Prince of Qi, once accused Li Shimin of crimes, and Emperor Gaozu, believing in the accusations, was set to punish Li Shimin, when Chen interceded for Li Shimin, pointing out his great contributions, and Emperor Gaozu did not punish Li Shimin.

== During Emperor Taizong's reign ==
In 626, Li Shimin, fearing that Li Jiancheng was about to kill him, set an ambush for Li Jiancheng and Li Yuanji at Xuanwu Gate and killed them. He then effectively forced Emperor Gaozu to create him crown prince and then yield the throne to him (as Emperor Taizong). Initially, Chen Shuda continued to serve as the head of the Chancellery, but later that year, in the middle of a major governmental reorganization by Emperor Taizong, Chen and another chancellor, Xiao Yu, argued at length before Emperor Taizong, and both were accused of being disrespectful and removed from their offices. Soon thereafter, Chen Shuda's mother died, and as Chen had previously himself been ill, Emperor Taizong feared for his physical well-being and ordered that guests not be allowed to visit Chen during his mourning. After he completed the mourning period, Emperor Taizong commissioned him as the commandant at Sui Prefecture (遂州, roughly modern Suining, Sichuan), but he, on account of illness, did not report to Sui Prefecture. Soon thereafter, Emperor Taizong made him the minister of ceremonies, stating to him, "During the Wude era [(Emperor Gaozu's era name)], I was in danger, but I know that you gave faithful words to the emperor. I thus commission you thus in return." Chen responded, "I did not only do this for Your Imperial Majesty, but did so for the state."

At a later point, Chen was accused of sexual immorality. (Note: The nature of the alleged immorality was not stated in historical records.) Emperor Taizong, as Chen was a well-known official, did not want his offense to be made public, and so had him retire with a minor office. He died in 635 and was initially given the unflattering posthumous name of Miao (繆, "inconsistent"). At a later point, he was posthumously awarded with the title of minister of census and had his posthumous name changed to Zhong (忠, "faithful").
