= Yingtao River =

Location
- Country: Wujing Town, Minhang District, Shanghai, China

Yingtao River
- Simplified Chinese: 樱桃河
- Traditional Chinese: 櫻桃河
- Hanyu Pinyin: Yīngtáo hé

The Yingtao River or Cherry River (Chinese: 樱桃河), originally named Xingdu Lake, named after the two surnames Xing and Dou who lived along the lake in Song and Yuan Dynasties, is a river in Shanghai City of China. It is located in the south of Wujing Town, Minhang District, Shanghai. It is part of a tributary on the north bank of the Huangpu River.

Cherry River starts from Yutang (俞塘) in the north and reaches the Huangpu River in the south, flows through the Minhang Campus of East China Normal University (华东师范大学闵行校区), and crosses Tangsiting (塘泗汀), Jiangjia Bay (蒋家湾), New Jiangjia Bay (新蒋家湾), Ledao River (乐道河) and Jinying River (金英河).

Cherry River is 5.36 kilometers long, with a surface width of 14 meters, a bottom width of 1 meter, and a water depth of more than 1 meter. Since the river flows slowly through the Minhang Campus of ECNU, it's called the mother river of the Minhang Campus of East China Normal University.
