= Princess Pingyang =

Chinese princess (590s–623)

Princess Zhao of Pingyang
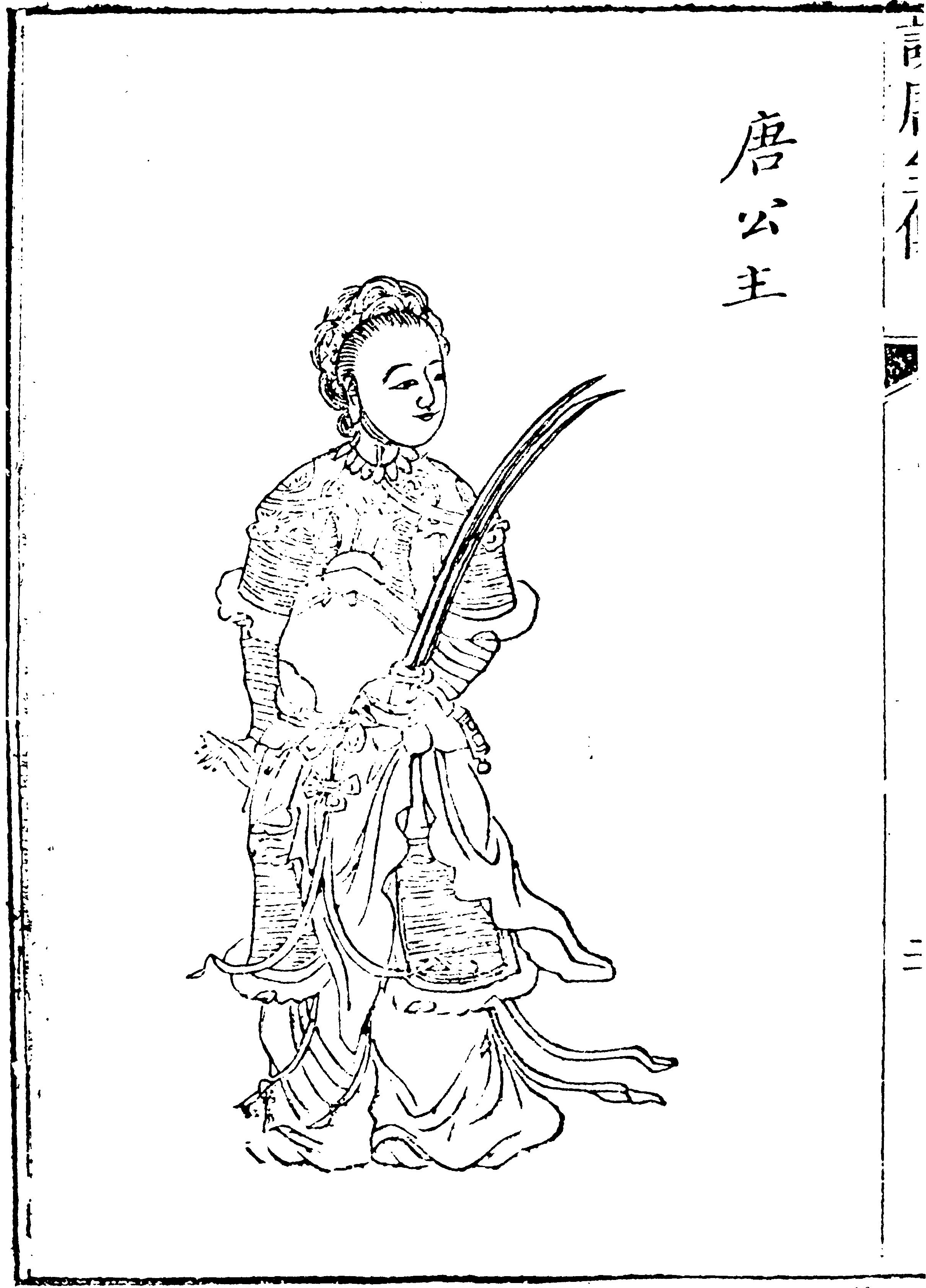
- Born: Between 583 and 598 (Note: While the birth year of the princess was not recorded in historical sources, it is known that she was older than Li Shimin. The Zizhi Tongjian recorded that Li Shimin (by then the emperor) apologized to Princess Changguang for executing Zhao Jie (her son with her first husband Zhao Cijing) and addressed her as "elder sister".. In vol.83 of Xin Tang Shu, Princess Changguang was listed as Li Yuan's fifth daughter. Thus, Princess Pingyang, as Li Yuan's third daughter, must be older than Li Shimin. It is unclear if Pingyang was older or younger than Li Jiancheng. While historical sources did not indicate when Li Yuan and Lady Dou were wedded, the date should be before Dou Yi's (Lady Dou's father) death on 3 Jan 583.)
- Died: March 623
- Spouse: Chai Shao (柴紹)
- Issue: Chai Zhewei, Duke of Qiao (柴哲威); Chai Lingwu, Duke of Xiangyang Commandery (柴令武)
Posthumous name
- Zhao (昭)
- Father: Emperor Gaozu of Tang
- Mother: Empress Taimu

Princess Pingyang (Chinese: 平陽公主; pinyin: Píngyáng Gōngzhǔ, formally Princess Zhao of Pingyang (平陽昭公主, died March 623) was a Chinese princess and general.

She was the only daughter of Li Yuan (later crowned as Emperor Gaozu), the founding emperor of the Tang dynasty, and his wife Empress Taimu. She helped him to seize power and eventually take over the throne from Sui dynasty by organizing an "Army of the Lady" (娘子軍), commanded by herself, in her campaign to capture the Sui capital Chang'an. She was the first woman general of the Tang dynasty.

== Background ==
The future Princess Pingyang was the third daughter of Li Yuan, then Duke of Tang, a hereditary nobleman of Sui China and cousin of Emperor Yang. She was his third daughter, but the only daughter of his wife Duchess Dou, who also bore four sons—Li Jiancheng, Li Shimin (later Emperor Taizong), Li Xuanba, and Li Yuanji. Eventually, Li Yuan gave her in marriage to Chai Shao, the son of Chai Shen (柴慎) the Duke of Julu.

She is not to be confused with another Princess Pingyang from the Western Han dynasty.

== Participation in Tang's founding ==
In 617, Li Yuan, then the general in charge at Taiyuan, was planning to rebel against Emperor Yang of Sui, by whom he had been imprisoned before. He sent messengers to his daughter and son-in-law Chai Shao, then at the Sui capital Chang'an, summoning them back to Taiyuan. Chai worried that they would not be able to escape together easily, and when he consulted her, she told him to go and that she, as a woman, would be able to hide more easily. He therefore secretly headed for Taiyuan and, after first meeting Li Jiancheng and Li Yuanji, whom Li Yuan had similarly recalled from Hedong (河東, now part of Yuncheng, Shanxi), reported to Taiyuan.

Pingyang hid initially, but then distributed her wealth to several hundred men, receiving their loyalty, before she rose in support of Li Yuan. She sent her servant Ma Sanbao (馬三寶) to persuade the agricultural rebel leader He Panren (何潘仁) to join her, then also persuaded other rebel leaders Li Zhongwen (李仲文), Xiang Shanzhi (向善志), and Qiu Shili (丘師利) to join her as well. She attacked and captured some of the nearby cities and garrisons, and she gathered a total of 70,000 men.

Late in 617, Li Yuan crossed the Yellow River into the Chang'an region and sent Chai Shao to rendezvous with her. They then joined Li Shimin, commanding one wing of Li Yuan's army. Chai and she set up separate headquarters as commanding generals, and her army became known as the "Army of the Lady”. In June 618, Li Yuan had Emperor Yang's grandson Yang You yield the throne to him, establishing the Tang dynasty as Emperor Gaozu. He entitled her as Princess Pingyang, and as she contributed greatly to his victory, he particularly favored and honored her over his 18 other daughters.

== Death ==
Princess Pingyang was not recorded as having been involved in another battle after her father's capture of Chang'an; she later died in March 623. While historians do not know the true cause of her death, one popular theory is that she died from childbirth, during the birth of her second son. An alternative theory is that she died from battle wounds which later caused health implications. There is speculation of various other causes, including assassination from her brothers and sacrifice during battle. However, these seem improbable, especially considering there were no records of her fighting after Chang’an. At her funeral on 18 March 623, Emperor Gaozu ordered that a grand military funeral, fit for a high general, be given for her. When officials of the Ministry of Rites objected to the presence of a band, stating that women's funerals were not supposed to have bands, he responded, "As you know, the princess mustered an army that helped us overthrow the Sui dynasty. She participated in many battles, and her help was decisive in founding the Tang dynasty. [...] She was no ordinary woman." The band did indeed play, thus making her the only woman in imperial Chinese history to be honored with a military funeral. After she passed, Niangzi Pass was named in her honor (also known as Lady's Pass, or Young Lady's Pass).

== Issue ==
Princess Pingyang and her husband, Chai Shao, had two sons:

- Chai Zhewei 柴哲威, titled Duke of Qiao
- Chai Lingwu 柴令武 (died 653), titled Duke of Xiangyang Commandery (襄阳郡公), married Emperor Taizong's daughter Princess Baling (巴陵公主)
