= Feng Deyi =

Chinese official of the Sui and Tang dynasties

Feng Deyi 封德彝
- Born: 568; Jing County, Hebei, Northern Qi
- Died: 627 (aged 58–59); Xi'an, Shaanxi, Tang dynasty
- Other names: Feng Lun (封倫); Duke Miao of Mi (密繆公)
- Occupation: Statesman
- Children: Feng Yandao; one daughter
- Father: Feng Zixiu

Feng Lun (Chinese: 封倫; 568 – 18 July 627), courtesy name Deyi (Chinese: 德彝), better known as Feng Deyi, formally Duke Miao of Mi, was a Chinese official of the Sui and Tang dynasties who served as a chancellor during the reigns of Emperor Gaozu of Tang and Emperor Taizong of Tang. He was praised for his quick thinking but criticized by historians for his being overly attentive to the emperors' desires.

== Background ==
Feng Deyi was born in 568, when his grandfather Feng Longzhi (封隆之) was a high level official for Northern Qi. (Note: Per part 2 of vol.71 of New Book of Tang, prominent members of the Feng clan included Feng Yi.) His father Feng Zixiu (封子繡) served as a provincial governor for Northern Zhou, but was captured by the Chen dynasty general Wu Mingche in a battle, probably in 573, during Wu's main offensive against Northern Qi. Sometime after Northern Qi was destroyed by Northern Zhou in 577, Feng Zixiu fled back north, and was made a provincial governor by Emperor Wen of Sui, whose Sui dynasty succeeded Northern Zhou in 581. Feng Deyi's mother Lady Lu was the sister of the official Lu Sidao. In Feng Deyi's youth, Lu Sidao often said, with regard to Feng Deyi, "This child is more intelligent than other people, and one day will surely be a highly-ranked official, even chancellor."

== During Emperor Wen's reign ==
In 589, Emperor Wen's forces destroyed Chen, reuniting China. In 590, with people in the Chen territory unaccustomed and aggrieved by Sui law, there were agrarian rebellions in much of former Chen territory, and Emperor Wen sent the major general Yang Su to quell the rebellions. Yang Su made Feng Deyi a secretary of his, and was impressed by Feng's calmness, particularly after an accident in which Feng was almost drowned but remained calm after the incident. Later, after he quelled the revolts, he was made chancellor, and he retained Feng on staff.

In 593, Emperor Wen put Yang Su in charge of constructing his summer palace Renshou Palace (仁壽宮, in modern Baoji, Shaanxi). Yang Su made Feng his assistant, and they constructed a magnificent palace, at much human and material cost. After the palace was completed in 595, the frugal Emperor Wen visited the palace and was initially displeased at its magnificence and human cost, rebuking Yang Su. Yang Su was fearful that Emperor Wen would punish him, but Feng correctly predicted that when Emperor Wen's wife Empress Dugu arrived at the palace, Yang Su would not only not receive punishment, but would be rewarded. That indeed happened, and when Yang Su, impressed with Feng's prediction, asked him the reason, Feng responded:

The emperor is frugal by nature, and therefore he was angry when he first saw the palace. But he is attentive to the empress' words. The empress, being a woman, favored beautiful things, and I knew that once this palace pleased the empress, she would change the emperor's mind.

Yang Su was impressed with Feng's analysis and praised him. Further, while Yang Su was proud of his own abilities and often found ways to insult others, he respected Feng and often requested Feng's opinions on the matters he needed to resolve as chancellor. He often touched his seat and stated, "One day Master Feng will have this seat," and he recommended Feng to Emperor Wen, who made Feng a mid-level official, Neishi Sheren (內史舍人), within the legislative bureau of his government (內史省, Neishi Sheng).

== During Emperor Yang's reign ==
In 604, Emperor Wen died and was succeeded by his son Emperor Yang. Emperor Yang, in 605, put Feng and Yuwen Kai (宇文愷) in charge of constructing the main palace at the eastern capital Luoyang, Xianren Palace (顯仁宮), and they constructed a magnificent palace. Despite this, Feng was not promoted, and was still Neishi Sheren as of 617.

In or around 617, Feng became a trusted advisor to the chancellor Yu Shiji. As Yu was unfamiliar with civil service, Feng effectively handled the civil service matters, and the edicts that he drafted were calculated to please Emperor Yang; he would also block the submissions made by officials who had different opinions than Emperor Yang. He was harsh in his application of laws, and often reduced rewards to officials with contributions. He was therefore blamed by the Old Book of Tang for Emperor Yang's increasing favors for Yu and the deteriorating state of Sui governance.

In spring 618, with the Sui state embroiled in agrarian rebellions, Emperor Yang was at Jiangdu (江都, in modern Yangzhou, Jiangsu), when the general Yuwen Huaji led a coup against Emperor Yang. After Yuwen's soldiers trapped Emperor Yang in the palace, Yuwen ordered Feng to publicly denounce Emperor Yang for his crimes. Emperor Yang told Feng, "You are well-learned. Why are you doing this?" Feng, in shame, withdrew from Emperor Yang's presence. Yuwen subsequently killed Emperor Yang and declared Emperor Yang's nephew Yang Hao the Prince of Qin emperor.

== During Emperor Gaozu's reign ==
Yuwen Huaji subsequently abandoned Jiangdu, leading the elite Xiaoguo Army (驍果) back north. He made Feng the head of the legislative bureau (內史令, Neishi Ling), a position that Feng continued to hold after Yuwen poisoned Yang Hao and declared himself the emperor of a new Xu state at Liaocheng (聊城, in modern Liaocheng, Shandong).

Feng, seeing that Yuwen Huaji, who was repeatedly defeated by other rebel leaders, including Li Mi the Duke of Wei, Li Shentong (李神通) the cousin of Li Yuan (who, also in 618, established Tang dynasty at Chang'an as its Emperor Gaozu), and Dou Jiande the Prince of Xia, was being weakened by the losses, befriended Yuwen Huaji's brother Yuwen Shiji, and suggested to Yuwen Shiji that he request permission from Yuwen Huaji to leave Liaocheng to collect food supplies for the army. Yuwen Huaji agreed, and Yuwen Shiji and Feng both left Liaocheng. After Liaocheng fell to Dou in 619, Yuwen Huaji was killed. Yuwen Shiji and Feng then fled to Tang territory. Emperor Gaozu, as he respected Feng as a Sui official, made him Neishi Sheren again, and soon promoted him to Neishi Shilang (內史侍郎), the deputy head of the legislative bureau. The chancellor Xiao Yu, impressed with Feng, recommended Feng, and Emperor Gaozu, in 620, made Feng Zhongshu Ling (中書令) -- a new title for the head of the legislative bureau, which Emperor Gaozu had changed the name of by this point to Zhongshu Sheng (中書省). As Zhongshu Ling, Feng was considered a chancellor as well.

Later in 620, Emperor Gaozu sent his son Li Shimin the Prince of Qin to attack Wang Shichong the Emperor of Zheng, whose capital was at Luoyang. Feng accompanied Li Shimin as one of his strategists. In 621, Dou came to Wang's aid, and Emperor Gaozu, initially believing that Li Shimin could not prevail under those circumstances, secretly ordered retreat. Instead of retreating, Li Shimin sent Feng back to Chang'an to analyze to Emperor Gaozu that Wang was in desperate straits, but that if allowed to survive, could regroup and become a serious threat later. Emperor Gaozu was persuaded and allowed Li Shimin to remain. Li Shimin subsequently defeated and captured Dou, and Wang surrendered, allowing Tang to defeat two major enemies simultaneously. Pleased, Emperor Gaozu praised Feng, comparing his advice to that of the Jin dynasty official Zhang Hua, whose advice had permitted Emperor Wu of Jin to destroy Eastern Wu. For his contributions, Feng was created the Duke of Pingyuan and continued to serve as Li Shimin's assistant.

Meanwhile, an intense rivalry was developing between Li Shimin and his older brother Li Jiancheng, who, as Emperor Gaozu's oldest son, was created crown prince. During Feng's service as Li Shimin's assistant, he was often suggesting Li Shimin various ways of seizing the position of crown prince from Li Jiancheng, but at the same time was developing a relationship with Li Jiancheng and Li Yuanji the Prince of Qi, another son of Emperor Gaozu who supported Li Jiancheng, thus playing both sides of the rivalry without either side knowing the extent of his involvement.

In 623, Feng, in addition to his other posts, also became acting minister of civil service matters. He was praised for his efficiency in the post. In 624, when Li Jiancheng was found to have improperly requisitioned soldiers to serve in his guard corps, and his guard commander Yang Wen'gan (楊文幹) then rebelled in fear, Emperor Gaozu considered deposing Li Jiancheng and replacing him with Li Shimin, but Feng made a secret submission arguing against such a move, and at least partly because of Feng's intercession, Emperor Gaozu did not depose Li Jiancheng. In 625, Feng was created the greater title of Duke of Dao, a title soon changed to Duke of Mi.

== During Emperor Taizong's reign ==
In 626, Li Shimin, fearing that Li Jiancheng was about to kill him, ambushed Li Jiancheng and Li Yuanji at Xuanwu Gate and killed them. He then effectively forced Emperor Gaozu to first create him crown prince and then yield the throne to him (as Emperor Taizong). He reorganized his government, and as part of the reorganization, Xiao Yu and Feng Deyi were made co-heads of the important executive bureau (尚書省, Shangshu Sheng), with the title of Shangshu Pushe (尚書僕射). They soon came in conflict, however, as Feng would often agree with Xiao on important matters, and then change his recommendations once they were before Emperor Taizong. Xiao, later in 626, became sufficiently angry at Feng that he wrote a submission to Emperor Taizong, denouncing Feng using unartful language. Emperor Taizong, who was already displeased with Xiao, who was also conflicting with his other chancellors Fang Xuanling and Du Ruhui, soon removed Xiao from his post.

In 627, Feng became ill while handling official matters at the executive bureau, and Emperor Taizong visited him personally, and then used an imperial wagon to take him back to his mansion. Feng soon died, and Emperor Taizong posthumously honored him with the high title Sikong (司空), giving him the posthumous name Ming (明, meaning "understanding").

When Feng died, Emperor Taizong had not known that Feng was in fact associating with both him and Li Jiancheng, but as he reviewed imperial archives several years later, he began to realize this. In 643, with Feng's involvement in both camps becoming clear, the official Tang Lin (唐臨) submitted a posthumous indictment, requesting that Feng's honors be posthumously stripped. Emperor Taizong accepted the advice of another official, Tang Jian (唐儉), who pointed out that Feng had contributions while he was alive and that the offices should not be stripped but suggested that the posthumous honors be stripped. However, he also changed Feng's posthumous name from Ming to Miao (繆, meaning "inconsistent").
