= Empress Taimu =

Lady Dou
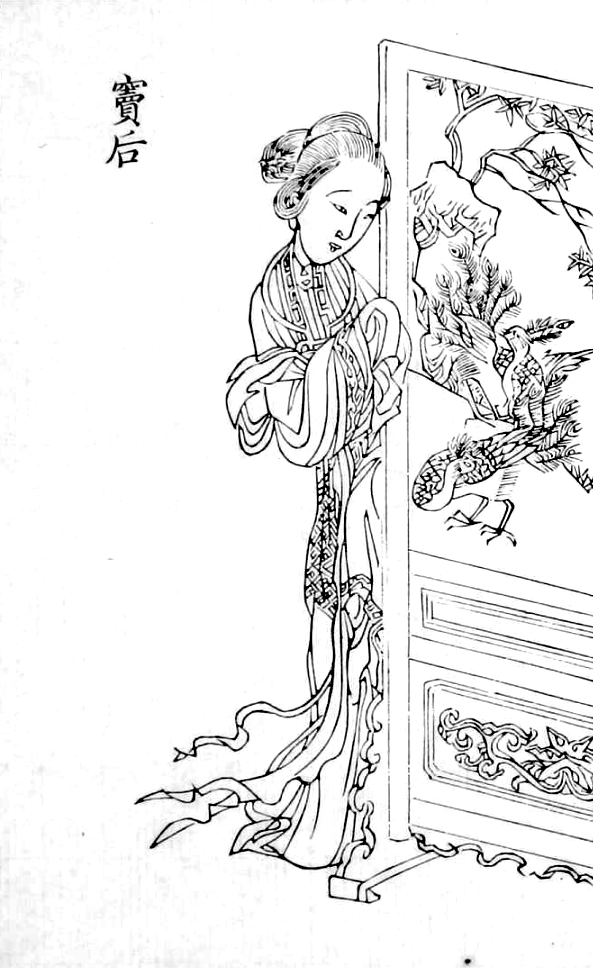
- Portrait of Lady Dou from Qing-era collection Baimei xinyong Tuzhuan (百美新咏图传)

Duchess of Tang
- Reign: 581? (Note: Historical sources did not indicate when Li Yuan and Lady Dou were wedded. However the date should be before Dou Yi's death on 3 Jan 583.) – 606?
- Born: 562? (Note: As Lady Dou was at least a child when Emperor Wu of Northern Zhou wedded Empress Ashina in 568, her birth year should be in the early 560s.)
- Died: 606? (Note: Although the birth and death years of Lady Dou were not recorded in historical sources, it was recorded that she died at the age of 45 (by East Asian reckoning). According to Tangwen Shiyi (唐文拾遗), her death anniversary was the 21st day of the 5th lunar month. According to her biography in the Old Book of Tang, Lady Dou died soon after giving her husband the advice of gifting the stallions in his possession to Emperor Yang; this event took place during the Daye era (605–618), while Li Yuan was Taishou (太守) of Fufeng (扶风). Li Yuan's biography in Old Book of Tang mentioned that he was Taishou of Xingyang and Loufan early in the Daye era, and in 613, he became Weiwei Shaoqing. Lady Dou's biography in New Book of Tang also dated the horse gifting anecdote to the Daye era, but did not record Li Yuan's position at the time. If Lady Dou's death year is 613, it should be after her second son Li Shimin's wedding to Lady Zhangsun, as Lady Zhangsun's biography in Old Book of Tang recorded that she was 13 (by East Asian reckoning) when she wedded.)
- Spouse: Li Yuan
- Issue: Li Jiancheng; Li Shimin; Li Xuanba; Li Yuanji; Princess Pingyang
Posthumous name
- Empress Taimu (太穆皇后)
- Father: Dou Yi
- Mother: Lady Yuwen, Princess Xiangyang

Empress Taimu (Chinese: 太穆皇后; 562?–606?) was posthumously honored the first empress of the Chinese Tang dynasty. She was known as Duchess Dou or Lady Dou (竇氏) throughout her lifetime, and was the wife of Emperor Gaozu and mother of Emperor Taizong.

== Background ==
Lady Dou was the daughter of Dou Yi (519 – 3 January 583) and Princess Xiangyang. Dou Yi was the son of Dou Yue (窦岳), an elder brother of Dou Chi (竇熾), a high-level official of both the Northern Zhou and successive Sui dynasties. (Note: Volume 30 of Book of Zhou indicate that Dou Yi was the son of an elder brother (兄子) of Dou Chi.) Dou Chi also had a son named Dou Wei, a scribe for Yang Xiu, the Prince of Shu, who later served as chancellor during the early years of the Tang dynasty. Her mother Princess Xiangyang was the fifth daughter of Yuwen Tai, Emperor Wen of Northern Zhou, and a sister of Empress Yuwen. (Note: Princess Xiangyang was older than Yuwen Yong, Emperor Wu of Northern Zhou.) Lady Dou also had an elder brother, Dou Xian (竇贤), (Note: Since Lady Dou was born when Dou Yi was already elderly, Dou Xian was likely older as he was already made Dou Yi's heir in 567. It is unknown when Dou Xian died, but it was between his father's death and the establishment of the Tang dynasty.) and at least one other elder cousin (Dou Kang).

As a young child, Lady Dou was raised in the palace and particularly favored by her uncle Yuwen Yong (Emperor Wu). She once recommended Yuwen Yong to establish a relationship between Northern Zhou and Tujue through the Heqin system. As a result, Yuwen Yong married Empress Ashina, the daughter of Muqan Qaghan on 20 April 568. Yuwen Yong didn't favor Empress Ashina at first, but agreed after Lady Dou and her father reminded him of Tujue's power and that he still had to face the rivaling neighbor kingdoms Northern Qi and Chen dynasty. (Note: This anecdote likely took place in 572, after Emperor Wu was able to exercise power after the death of Yuwen Hu.)

Lady Dou persuaded the general Zhangsun Sheng (長孫晟) to form a marriage alliance with the Tang household. Zhangsun Sheng's son Zhangsun Wuji would later become a prominent official and daughter Lady Zhangsun would become Lady Dou's daughter-in-law. After Yang Jian overthrew the Yuwen family and established the Sui dynasty in March 581, Lady Dou lamented that she wasn't able to help her uncle and cousins. Her parents Dou Yi (by then about 62 years old) and Princess Xiangyang cautioned her to keep her mouth shut in order to live.

== Duchess ==
As Lady Dou grew older, Dou Yi told Princess Xiangyang to marry their daughter to a wise and intelligent gentleman. Dou Yi placed two peacocks between an armorial screen and let the proposers shoot two arrows. The proposer who could shoot two arrows on the peacock's eye would be married to Lady Dou. Several proposers failed, except for a man named Li Yuan. Lady Dou and Li Yuan were married, and Li Yuan would later become the founding emperor of the Tang dynasty.

Lady Dou and Li Yuan were deeply in love and accompanied each other everywhere. Since Lady Dou grew up in the palace, she was familiar with politics and history books. She assisted her husband in his studies and raised their children. They had four sons, Li Jiancheng, Li Shimin, Li Xuanba, and Li Yuanji, and one daughter who would become Princess Pingyang.

Lady Dou established a close bond with her mother-in-law, Lady Dugu. Lady Dugu was a daughter of the prominent general Dugu Xin, and a sister of two empresses from different dynasties, Empress Dugu and Dugu Qieluo. Li Yuan's father Li Bing had died early, leaving Lady Dugu in charge of the Li household. Lady Dugu suffered from poor health, and Lady Dou assisted her mother-in-law in managing household affairs. Once, Lady Dugu was extremely sick and due to her reckless and adamant personality, several of her daughter-in-laws refused to assist her. Only Lady Dou cared for Lady Dugu, and Lady Dugu recovered after a month. Lady Dugu was grateful and favored Lady Dou.

== Death and posthumous honors ==
Lady Dou died in Zhuo Prefecture at the age of 45 (by East Asian reckoning). After Li Yuan was made Prince of Tang, Lady Dou was given the posthumous name "Mu" on 8 January 618. After Li Yuan overthrew the Sui dynasty and established the Tang dynasty, he honored Lady Dou as Empress Mu (穆皇后) on 3 July 618. When her son Li Shimin succeeded to the throne as Emperor Taizong, he honored Lady Dou as Empress Taimu (太穆皇后) on 12 December 635. She was further honored as Empress Taimu Shunsheng (太穆顺圣皇后) on 22 July 749.

== Family ==
Parents

- Father: Dou Yi, Duke Shenwu (河南 竇毅; 519 – 3 January 583)
- Mother: Princess Xiangyang (襄陽公主),
  - Maternal Grandfather: Yuwen Tai (宇文泰, 507 – 556)

Spouse and issue(s):

- Li Yuan (李淵, 7 April 566 – 25 June 635), Emperor Gaozu of Tang
  - Li Jiancheng, Crown Prince Yin (隱皇太子 李建成; 589–626)
  - Princess Pingyangzhao (平陽昭公主; d. 623),
    - Married Chai Shao, Duke Huo (d. 638), and had issue (two sons)
  - Li Shimin, Emperor Taizong (太宗 李世民; 598–649)
  - Li Xuanba, Prince Weihuai (衛懷王 李玄霸; 599–614)
  - Li Yuanji, Prince Chaola (巢剌王 李元吉; 603–626)
