= Chunxia Dou =

Chinese electrical engineer

Chunxia Dou (Chinese: 窦春霞) is a Chinese electrical engineer whose research concerns distributed control systems for smart grids and their resilience against denial-of-service attacks. She is a professor at the Nanjing University of Posts and Telecommunications, deputy director of the Jiangsu Provincial Engineering Research Center for Active Distribution Network Zero-Carbon Operation Control, and vice chair of the IEEE Power & Energy Society (China) Smart Grid New Technology Sub-Committee.

== Education and career ==
Dou studied automation at the Northeast Heavy Machinery Institute (now Yanshan University), receiving a bachelor's degree in 1989 and a master's degree in 1994. She worked there as a teaching assistant and lecturer. She returned to graduate study at Yanshan University in electrical engineering, from 2001 until 2005, when she completed her doctorate.

She remained affiliated with Yanshan University as an associate professor, professor, and doctoral tutor until 2020. In the meantime she did postdoctoral research at Peking University from 2011 to 2013, and took her present position as a professor at the Nanjing University of Posts and Telecommunications in 2015.

== Recognition ==
Dou is a recipient of the IEEE Power & Energy Society (China) Outstanding Female Scientist Award. She was named as an IEEE Fellow, in the 2025 class of fellows, "for contributions to power system control and industrial applications".
