= Dou Kang =

Chinese official and general

Dou Kang 竇抗
- Born: Unknown; Pinglu County, Shanxi
- Died: 621
- Other name: Daosheng (道生)
- Occupations: Statesman, general
- Children: Dou Yan; Dou Jing; Dou Dan; Dou Shigan; Dou Shilun; Dou Shiwu; Dou Shiren; Dou Jiao
- Parents: Dou Rongding (father); Princess Cheng'an (mother)
- Relatives: Dou Gui (cousin)

Dou Kang (died 621), courtesy name Daosheng, was an official and general during the Sui and Tang dynasties who briefly served as a chancellor early in the reign of Emperor Gaozu of Tang.

== Family ==
Parents

- Father: Dou Rongding (窦荣定)
- Mother: Princess Cheng'an (成安公主), elder sister of Yang Jian, first emperor of the Sui dynasty

Wives and children

- Yuwen Rusou（宇文汝薮）, daughter of Yuwen Zhen (宇文贞), Duke Cheng of Fengli (丰利成公)
- Lady Doulu, of the Doulu clan (豆卢氏), sister of Doulu Kuan (豆卢宽)
  - Dou Shilun (窦师纶), Duke of Lingyang Commandery (陵阳郡开国公), fourth son
- Unknown
  - Dou Yan (竇衍), Duke Mi of Chen (陈密公), first son
  - Dou Jing (窦静), Baron of Xindou County (信都縣男), second son
  - Dou Dan (竇誕), Duke An of Shen (莘安公), third son
  - Dou Shigan (窦师干), third son
  - Dou Shiwu (窦师武), fifth son
  - Dou Shiren (窦师仁), sixth son
  - Dou Jiao (窦皦), Duke of Pingling Commandery (平陵县开国公), seventh son

== Background ==
It is not known when Dou Kang was born. His father was Dou Rongding (竇榮定), who carried the Sui title of Duke of Chen. His mother was the Princess Ancheng, sister to Sui dynasty's founder Emperor Wen. As the emperor's nephew, Dou Kang was treated well by Emperor Wen, and was a student at the imperial university in his youth. He also became a guard for Emperor Wen. He was also an elder cousin of Lady Dou.

== During the Sui dynasty ==
After Dou Rongding died in 586, Dou Kang inherited the title of Duke of Chen. He was then made the governor of Liang Province (梁州, roughly modern Hanzhong, Shaanxi). Before his departing the capital Chang'an to report to Liang Province, Emperor Wen personally visited Dou Kang and Princess Ancheng. Later, when Princess Ancheng died, Dou Kang was said to be in much distress in mourning that he fainted several times, and Emperor Wen sent his servants to comfort Dou Kang. Thereafter, Emperor Wen recalled him to governmental service as the governor of Qi Province (岐州, roughly modern Baoji, Shaanxi), and then as the commandant at Youzhou (modern Beijing, Tianjin and northern Hebei). Dou developed a reputation for being generous and merciful, during these terms of service.

In 604, Emperor Wen died—a death that traditional historians generally believe to be a murder ordered by his son and crown prince Yang Guang, although they admitted a lack of direct evidence. Yang Guang took the throne as Emperor Yang. Immediately thereafter, another son of Emperor Wen, Yang Liang the Prince of Han, rebelled against Emperor Yang at Bing Province (并州, roughly modern Taiyuan, Shanxi). Emperor Yang, for reasons not stated in historical accounts, suspected Dou of collaborating with Yang Liang and sent the general Li Zixiong (李子雄) rushing to You Province to arrest Dou and replace him. Li subsequently alleged that Dou had received letters from Yang Liang urging him to join the rebellion but had not reported them to Emperor Yang. However, after an investigation, Emperor Yang concluded that there was a lack of evidence that Dou collaborated with Yang Liang, but nevertheless removed him from governmental service and further stripped him of the title of Duke of Chen, bestowing that title on his younger brother Dou Qing (竇慶) instead.

Dou Kang was friendly with another general, Li Yuan the Duke of Tang, the husband of a cousin of his. During the rebellion of the general Yang Xuangan in 613, when Li Yuan was commissioned with an army, it was said that Dou told Li,

Is it not that Yang Xuangan is providing you with an opportunity? The prophecies refer to the Li clan as the originator of the next emperor, and you can use this opportunity. This is a divine revelation.

Li responded, "I will not be the start of a rebellion. Why do you speak in such daring terms?" Nevertheless, he kept Dou's suggestion in mind.

Toward the end of Emperor Yang's reign, Dou was commissioned with an army at Lingwu to secure the northern border. After Li Yuan rebelled against Emperor Yang in 617 and subsequently captured Chang'an, declaring Emperor Yang's grandson Yang You the Prince of Dai emperor (as Emperor Gong), Dou submitted to him in spring 618, along with the several commanderies he controlled in the region.

== During the Tang dynasty ==
Soon thereafter, Emperor Yang was killed in a coup at Jiangdu (江都, in modern Yangzhou, Jiangsu) led by the general Yuwen Huaji. When the news reached Chang'an, Li Yuan had Yang You yield the throne to him, establishing Tang dynasty as its Emperor Gaozu. Dou Kang, who was then the minister of engineering, was given the additional title of Nayan (納言), the head of the examination bureau of the government and a post considered to be one for a chancellor. He often attended Emperor Gaozu in the palace. Emperor Gaozu referred to him as "brother," and within the palace, he was referred to as "uncle."

In winter 618, Dou Kang was no longer Nayan, and was made a general. He soon assisted Emperor Gaozu's son Li Shimin the Prince of Qin in defeating a major enemy, Xue Rengao the Emperor of Qin. In 621, he also assisted Li Shimin in attacking Wang Shichong the Emperor of Zheng, and after Wang surrendered, nine officials were particularly honored at the imperial ancestors' temple, among them were Dou Kang and his cousin Dou Gui (竇軌); he was also given much material rewards. Later that year, during an imperial feast, Dou Kang died suddenly.

== Sources ==
- Old Book of Tang, vol. 61.
- New Book of Tang, vol. 95.
- Zizhi Tongjian, vols. 185, 186.
