= Li Xuanba =

Li Xuanba (Chinese: 李玄霸; 599–614), courtesy name Dade (大德), posthumous name Prince Huai of Wei (衛懷王), was the third son of the Emperor Gaozu of Tang. His mother was Lady Dou. He died in 614, before his father founded the Tang dynasty, after being struck on the head by his own weapon. He died sonless, so Li Tai, son of his elder brother Li Shimin, was created his heir as Prince of Yingdu (宜都王) in 621. When Li Shimin became emperor, he re-designated Li Tai as his own son and created another clansman Li Baoding as heir to Li Xuanba. After Baoding also died sonless in 631, the Principality of Wei was abolished.

== In popular culture ==
li Xuanba is portrayed by Hong Kong actor Derek Kok in TVB's 1987 series The Grand Canal (大運河)
