= Chai Shao =

Chinese general (588–638)

Chai Shao 柴紹
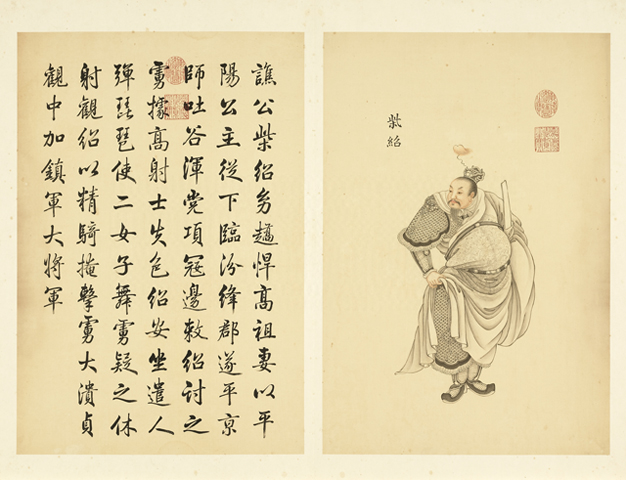
- Portrait of Chai Shao (1747)
- Born: 588
- Died: 638 (aged 49–50)
- Other names: Sichang (嗣昌); Duke Xiang of Qiao (譙襄公)
- Occupation: General
- Spouse: Princess Pingyang
- Father: Chai Shen

Chai Shao (588–638), courtesy name Sichang, posthumous name Duke Xiang of Qiao, was a Chinese general who served under the emperors Gaozu and Taizong in the early Tang dynasty.

Chai Shao was the son of Chai Shen, the Duke of Julu. He married Princess Pingyang, a daughter and general of Emperor Gaozu, the founder of the Tang dynasty, and distinguished himself as a general in the battles between the Tang dynasty and Eastern Turkic Khaganate. On one occasion, when he was attacking the Tuyuhun forces which then threatened the frontier, his army was almost overwhelmed by a dense shower of arrows from the enemy's bows. However, Chai Shao sent forward some girls to play and dance to the Tartar guitar, which so fascinated the Tartar soldiers that they desisted from the fight to watch. Meanwhile, Chai Shao, by a rapid strategic movement, succeeded in surrounding them, and the whole force was cut to pieces. He aided Emperor Taizong in consolidating his control over the Tang Empire. In 628, he was appointed as the governor of Huazhou in Shaanxi.

== Issue ==
Chai and Princess Pingyang had two sons:

- Chai Zhewei (柴哲威), titled Duke of Qiao
- Chai Lingwu (柴令武, died 653), titled Duke of Xiangyang Commandery (襄阳郡公), married Emperor Taizong's daughter Princess Baling (巴陵公主)

== See also ==
- Tuyuhun invasion of Gansu
