= Battle of Yinshan =

Battle between the Tang dynasty and Eastern Turkic Khaganate

- Part of Tang campaign against the Eastern Turks
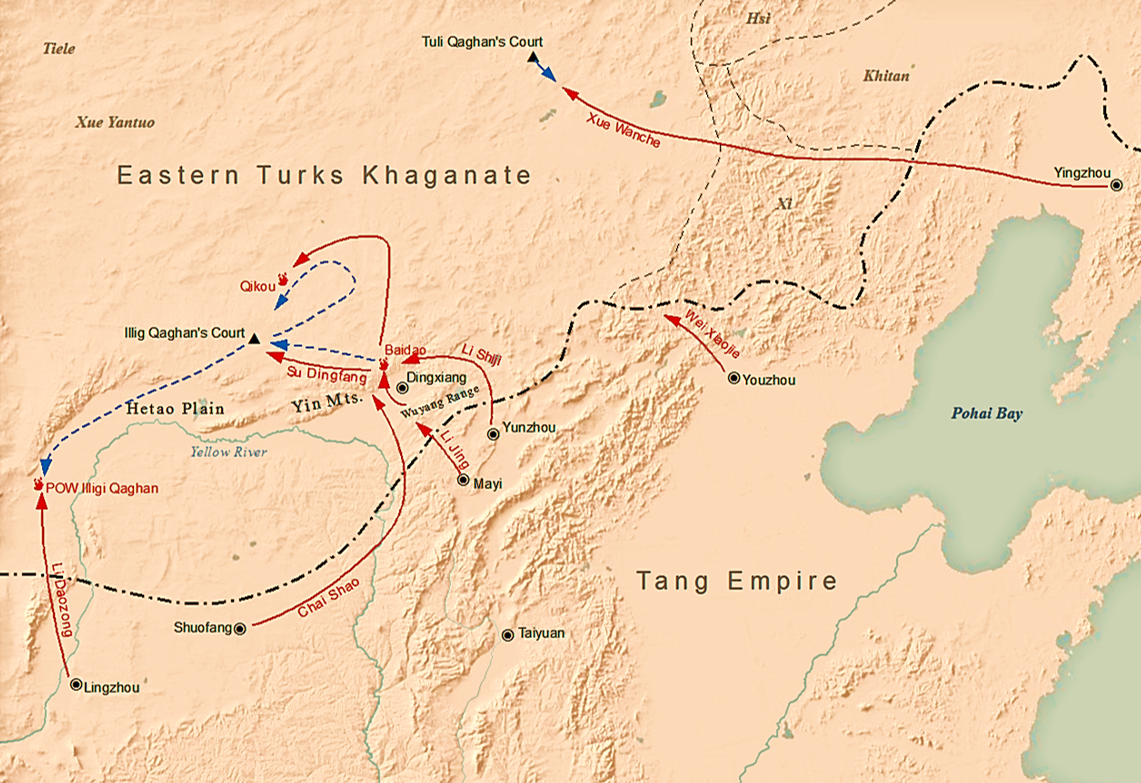
Date	27 March 630
Location	Yin Mountains, Inner Mongolia
Result	Tang victory
Territorial changes	Annexation of the Eastern Turkic Khaganate by the Tang

Belligerents
Tang dynasty	Eastern Turkic Khaganate

Commanders and leaders
Li Jing; Wei Xiaojie; Li Daozong; Chai Shao; Xue Wanche (薛萬徹)	Illig Qaghan

Strength
20,000	40,000

Casualties and losses
Light	100,000 captured, 10,000+ dead

The Battle of Yinshan (Chinese: 陰山之戰; pinyin: Yīnshān zhī zhàn) was fought on 27 March 630 near the Yin Mountains, close to the city of Dingxiang (定襄, in modern Hohhot, Inner Mongolia). Emperor Taizong (598–649) commissioned the famed Tang military officer Li Jing (李靖, 571–649), along with Li Shiji, Wei Xiaojie, Li Daozong, Chai Shao (柴紹), and Xue Wanche (薛萬徹) to attack forces under the command of Illig Qaghan, leader of the Eastern Turkic Khaganate, a nomadic confederation of Turkic peoples based in Inner Asia. The battle ended in defeat for the Eastern Turkic Khaganate and resulted in its dissolution, and was eventually replaced by the Protectorate General to Pacify the North, otherwise known as the Anbei Protectorate (安北都護府) in 647 after the Tang dynasty definitively conquered the Xueyantuo.

== Background ==
In 623, The Eastern Turkic Khaganate began a campaign of routine pillaging incursions into Tang territory, while continuing to protect Liang Shidu, who claimed the title of Emperor of Liang. In 626, Li Shimin succeeded Emperor Gaozu as Emperor Taizong of the Tang. Less than a month later, the Turkic ruler Illig Qaghan and his nephew, Ashina Shibobi, invaded Tang territory, advancing all the way to the ancient capital Chang'an, shocking Tang officials. Emperor Taizong personally met with them at the Wei River Bridge outside Chang'an, gave them and major Eastern Turkic officials gifts, and promised further tribute. Only after he did so did Illig Qaghan and Ashina Shibobi withdraw.

For the next several years, there was relative peace between the Tang and the Eastern Turkic Khaganate. Meanwhile, Illig Qaghan's territory suffered two unusually cold winters that led to mass livestock deaths and famine and he was forced to suppress a number of rebellions. By 627, Emperor Taizong contemplated taking advantage of Illig Qaghan's weakened state by launching an attack, but ultimately refrained after his advisers convinced him not to break the peace.

Internal strife within the Eastern Turkic Khaganate continued as vassal tribes became restless under Illig Qaghan's rule. Illig Qaghan and Ashina Shibobi also fell into conflict after the latter was unable to defeat rebellious Xueyantuo and Uyghur vassal tribes. After Illig Qaghan attacked Asina Shibobi's forces in 628, Emperor Taizong, who had sworn to be a blood brother of Ashina Shibobi on a prior occasion, agreed to launch troops to protect Ashina Shibobi—and at the same time use the opportunity to attack Liang Shidu, who by this point was still under the Eastern Turkic Khaganate's protection. Liang Shidu was assassinated in 628, ending the final rival claim to Emperor Taizong for China's imperial throne. To head off Taizong's efforts to ally with rebellious vassal tribes against him, Illig Qaghan sought long-term peace in the form of a marriage to a Tang princess, which Emperor Taizong did not answer. Instead, he prepared for a major assault on the Eastern Turkic Khaganate, with the major general Li Jing commanding and with the general Zhang Gongjin assisting Li Jing.

== Battle ==
In the spring of 630, Li Jing, employing six separate cavalry formations of nearly 100,000 men along a 1,200 km (750 mi) front, captured the Wuyang Range outside Dingxiang (定襄, in modern Hohhot, Inner Mongolia), approaching Illig Qaghan's court. He then sent spies to Illig Qaghan's camp and persuaded a number of his close associates, including Kangsumi (康蘇密), to surrender (along with Sui's Empress Xiao and her grandson Yang Zhengdao). Li Jing's nighttime assault on the walls of Dingxiang forced Illig Qaghan to withdraw to Iron Mountain (Tieshan) in the Yin Mountains where he offered to submit to Emperor Taizong—but while he was negotiating with the Emperor Taizong's envoy Tang Jian (唐儉), he was also considering withdrawing further north of the Gobi Desert. Li Jing and Li Shiji, believing that Illig Qaghan was merely stalling for time, joined their forces and their vanguard, Su Dingfang, attacked Illig Qaghan's encampment on 27 March 630, defeating him and killing his wife (the Sui dynasty's Princess Yicheng). Illig Qaghan fled further to his subordinate khan Ashina Sunishi (阿史那蘇尼失), but was soon captured by the Tang generals Li Daozong and Zhang Baoxiang (張寶相) and delivered to Chang'an. Turkic nobles largely surrendered to the Tang, while the Turkic Khaganate's people scattered in three directions—either surrendering to Tang, surrendering to the Xueyantuo, or fleeing west to the Western Turkic Khaganate and nearby kingdoms such as Qocho, Kucha, and Tuyuhun.

== Aftermath ==
Emperor Taizong eventually decided to have the Eastern Turkic Khaganate's people settled in the northern prefectures within Tang borders, remaining in tribal form, on lands that were currently not settled. He established four nominal prefectures over Ashina Shibobi's tribes and six nominal prefectures over Illig Qaghan's tribes, with two commandants governing the areas. Ashina Sunishi and another Eastern Turkic Khaganate prince, Ashina Simo (who, in particular, was given the Tang imperial surname Li and therefore also known as Li Simo), were made princes, and a large number of other chieftains were given general ranks; they were settled in or near Chang'an. Emperor Taizong also gave the Eastern Turkic Khaganate's people who possessed Han people as slaves ransoms and had them return those Han slaves to the Tang. Also thereafter, Emperor Taizong often requisitioned Turkic cavalry soldiers to supplement regular Tang troops on various campaigns, such as the 634 campaign against Tuyuhun.

Meanwhile, the Xueyantuo largely took over the Eastern Turkic Khaganate's former territory, with most of Eastern Turkic Khaganate's former vassals submitting to it. The former Eastern Turkic Khaganate's vassals Khitan, Xí (霫), and Xī (奚) tribes directly submitted to the Tang, as did the city-state of Yiwu (伊吾).
