= Li Jin =

Li Jin or Jin Li may refer to:

== People with the surname Li ==
- Li Jin (Tang dynasty) (died 750), nephew of Emperor Xuánzong of Tang
- Jin Li (computer scientist) (born 1971), a founding member of Microsoft Research Asia
- Li Jin (swimmer) (born 1982), Chinese swimmer

== People with the surname Jin ==
- Jin Li (born 1963), Chinese geneticist

== See also ==
- Lijin (disambiguation)
- Jinli, street in Chengdu, Sichuan, China
- Li Jing (disambiguation)
- Li of Jin (disambiguation)
- Jin (Later Tang precursor) (?–923), a dynastic state of China ruled by the Li family
