= Ashina Sunishi =

7th-century Tang dynasty general of Turkic descent

Commander of Chang Prefecture
- Tenure: 630–634
- Predecessor: Himself as Governor of Beining
- Successor: Ashina Zhong
- Died: 634; Chang'an, Tang dynasty
- Issue: Ashina Zhong
Names
- Ashina Sunishi (阿史那蘇尼失)
Posthumous name
- Prince Yuan of Huaide (懷德元王)
- House: Ashina
- Dynasty: Eastern Turkic Khaganate
- Father: Ishbara Qaghan (?)

Ashina Sunishi (? – 634; Chinese: 阿史那蘇尼失), posthumous name Prince Yuan of Huaide (懷德元王), was a lesser qaghan of the Eastern Turkic Khaganate who later submitted to the Tang dynasty and served as a military general in the Tang army. He was made the Commandery Prince of Huaide (懷德郡王) by Emperor Taizong of Tang.

== Family ==
The Old Book of Tang describes him as a clan nephew (son of a male cousin) of Illig Qaghan, while New Book of Tang says he was the younger brother of Qimin Qaghan (father of Illig), and the Zizhi Tongjian, however, describes him as uterine brother of Qimin Qaghan. Ashina Zhong's tomb epitaph portrays him as a son of Yongzhou Qaghan (Chinese: 邕周, romanized: Yōngzhōu) and a grandson of Dayuan (Chinese: 大原, romanized: Dàyuán). Wu Yugui argued that they were Ishbara Qaghan and Issik Qaghan respectively.

== Life ==
It was reported that Shibi Khagan greatly valued Ashina Sunishi and appointed him as Ishbara Shad (沙鉢羅設), commanding tribes of 50,000 households, establishing his headquarters northwest of Lingzhou. Sunishi was considered brave, valiant, and benevolent, winning the hearts of the tribes. When Tang forced invaded Eastern Khaganate and Illig Qaghan's political situation descended into chaos, Sunishi's tribes remained loyal without divided allegiances. He was promoted to Lesser Qaghan when Ashina Shihobi fled to Tang.

During the fall of the Qaghanate, Illig tried to escape to Tuyuhun kingdom, where his mother was from. However, Taizong's cousin Li Daozong, caught with him and demanded Sunishi hand over Illig. Illig on the other hand, led several cavalrymen and fled at night towards Helan Mountains, hiding in a desolate valley. Sunishi, in fear, urgently dispatched cavalry to capture and bring Illig back. Vice-commander Zhang Baoxiang soon led a large army to surround Sunishi's camp, captured Illig and sent him back to Chang'an on May 2, 630 while Sunishi surrendered.

He was created Commandery Prince of Huaide (Chinese: 懷德郡王, romanized: Huáidé Jùnwáng) by Taizong 6 days later. On June 4, 630 he was appointed as Governor of Beining Prefecture (Chinese: 北寧州) and Right Guard Great General. This prefecture was reorganized into Chang Prefecture in 633, where Sunishi continued to serve as the head. Next year, Sunishi passed away right after Illig Qaghan in 634 (New Book of Tang says he committed suicide).
