= Li Ching =

Li Ching or Ching Li may refer to:

People surnamed Li

- Li Jing (deity), fictional character in Fengshen Yanyi, romanized as "Li Ching" in Wade–Giles
- Li Jing (Tang dynasty) (571–649), Chinese general during the Tang, romanized as "Li Ching" in Wade–Giles
- Li Jing (Southern Tang) (916–961), Southern Tang emperor, romanized as "Li Ching" in Wade–Giles
- Li Ching (actress) (born 1948), China-born Hong Kong actress
- Li Ching (table tennis) (born 1975), China-born Hong Kong table tennis player

People surnamed Ching

- Ching Li (born 1945), China-born Hong Kong actress

Li Ching may also refer to:

- Book of Rites, also known as Classic of Rites (禮經; Li Jing, or Li Ching in Wade–Giles)

== See also ==
- Li Cheng (disambiguation)
- Li Ch'ing (disambiguation)
- Li Jing (disambiguation)
