= Tang campaign against the Eastern Turks =

Conquest of the Eastern Turkic Khaganate by the Tang dynasty

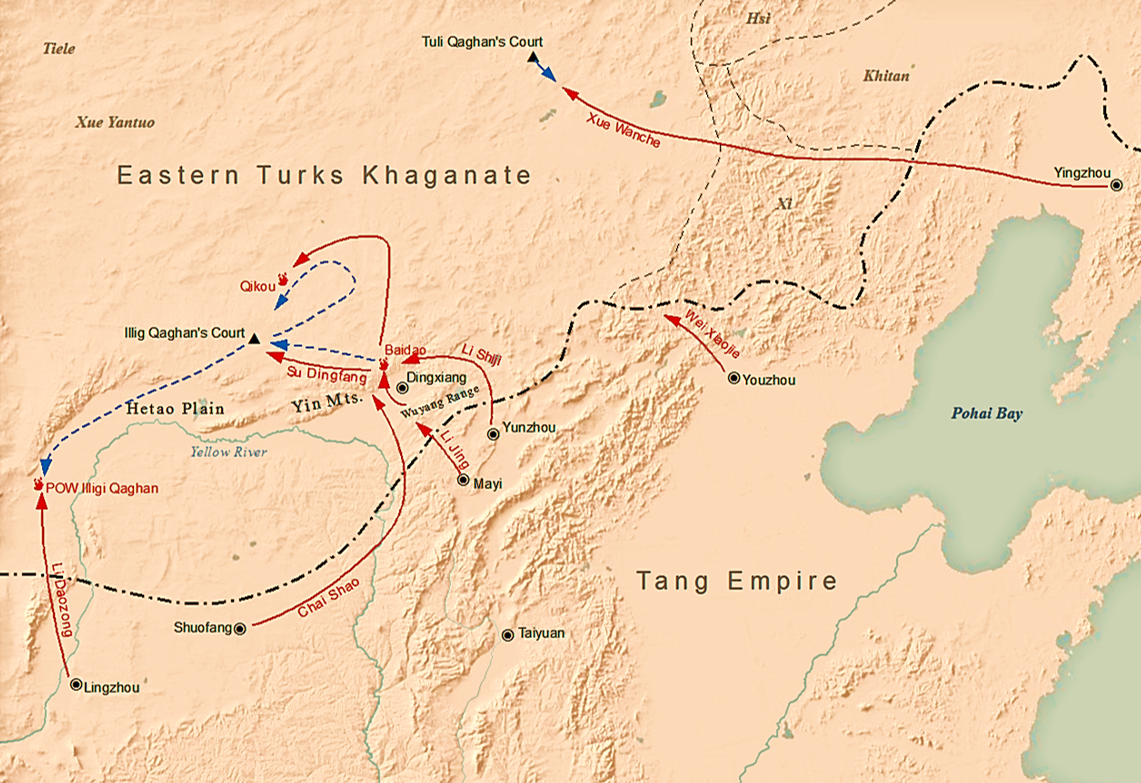
- Tang's campaign against Eastern Turks in 629–630
Date	629–630
Location	Dingxiang, Gobi Desert and Hetao Plain
Result	Tang victory: Fall of the Eastern Turkic Khaganate; Establishment of Anbei Protectorate

Belligerents
Tang dynasty	Eastern Turkic Khaganate

Commanders and leaders
Emperor Taizong of Tang; Li Jing; Li Shiji; Xue Wanche; Chai Shao; Wei Xiaojie; Li Daozong; Su Dingfang	Illig Qaghan (POW)

Strength
100,000	150,000

Casualties and losses
Unknown	At least 10,000 dead; 100,000 surrendered

The Tang campaign against the Eastern Turks was an armed conflict between the Tang dynasty and the Eastern Turkic Khaganate in 629–630 that resulted in the Eastern Turks' destruction.

The khaganate, led by Illig Qaghan, had threatened the Tang early in the reign of Emperor Taizong (r. 626–649). The Tang waited several years to prepare for war by appeasing the khaganate. When severe cold weather conditions destroyed a large portion of the nomadic livestock, the Eastern Turks' subjects rebelled against their rule. Illig's nephew Ashina Shibobi defected to the Tang and sought their support to defeat Illig. The Tang also formed an alliance with the Xueyantuo, a vassal of the khaganate seeking independence. The Tang offensive launched in the winter of 629, led by General Li Jing, caught Illig by surprise while negotiations were underway and massacred the Khan's camp without a fight. Illig Qaghan was captured by surrendered Turks in 630 and handed over to the Tang.

Illig died in China and the Eastern Turks were resettled on the Ordos plateau and north of the Yellow River as a buffer against the Xueyantuo. They rebelled several times but failed to resurrect the Eastern Turkic Khaganate until Illig's grandson Ilterish Qaghan founded the Second Turkic Khaganate in the 680s.

== Background ==
In 617, the leader of the Eastern Turkic Khaganate, Shibi Qaghan, supported various rebel factions in China to keep it divided after the collapse of the Sui dynasty. This included the founding emperor of the Tang, Li Yuan, whom the Eastern Turks provided with 2,000 horses. The Turks also extracted tribute from Li Yuan. When Li Yuan had grown too strong, the Turks threw their support behind his rivals Liu Wuzhou (Dingyang Khan) and Liu Heita (Prince of Handong).

Following the Tang victory over their rivals, the Eastern Turks began asserting control over Tang territory through routine raids from 623 to 626. The incursion of 626 led by Illig Qaghan reached the north bank of the Wei River across from Chang'an. Emperor Taizong of Tang rode out to parley, resulting in the Turks' withdrawal, which probably involved a tribute payment. Taizong immediately started preparations to strengthen the military. The guardsmen in the capital underwent a military training program and an edict was issued for military drills and maneuvers to be practiced during the agricultural slack seasons. Taizong established new units of mounted archers that he trained personally and organized large scale maneuvers for light cavalry to familiarize his generals with warfare on the steppes.

A volcanic eruption occurred in 626 causing the weather to cool precipitously in Mongolia and northern China. In the spring or autumn of 627, severe snow weather caused a mass die-off among the nomads' livestock. Rather than helping the struggling population, Illig demanded subject tribes to make greater contributions, causing the subordinate peoples of the Turk empire to openly revolt by the summer of 628. The most threatening of the rebels were the Xueyantuo who inhabited the area north of the Gobi Desert. When Illig's nephew Ashina Shibobi failed to put down the uprisings, Illig had him flogged, resulting in his refusal to provide further military support. Illig attacked Shibobi, forcing him to flee to the Tang for support. A Tang general was sent to Taiyuan to begin preparations for a major offensive against Illig.

== Tang invasion ==
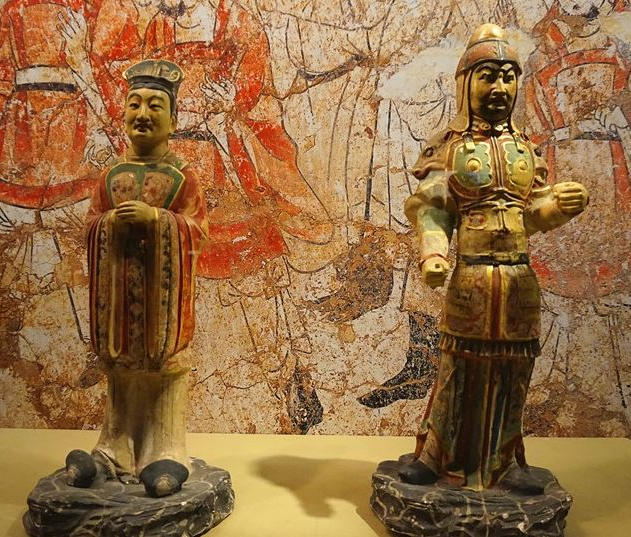
Official and soldier, Tang dynasty tomb figurines

On 11 September, Li Jing was appointed commander-in-chief of the expeditionary army. On 13 December, he commenced the offensive operation.

The Tang army divided into six columns and marched against the Eastern Türks along a 1,200-kilometre (750 mi) front. The central column led by Li Jing marched north from Mayi toward Dingxiang, where Illig Qaghan was encamped. Li Jing occupied the ridge south of Dingxiang with 3,000 light cavalry. At night, the Tang forces attacked Dingxiang and penetrated the outer wall, forcing Illig to flee north to a place called Iron Mountain. Meanwhile, Li Shiji's forces joined Li Jing at Baidao Pass.

Illig tried to sue for peace. As negotiations were underway, Li Jing and Li Shiji made a surprise attack on Illig's camp on 27 March 630. Li Jing set out with 10,000 light cavalry while Li Shiji led another column to block the northern escape route. The Türks were caught unaware and Li Jing's 10,000 cavalry were able to charge directly into the camp, resulting in a massacre where some 10,000 Türks were killed. Illig was able to escape on a fast horse but was later caught by Türks who had surrendered to the Tang and handed over to Tang officers on 12 May 630. The surrendered Türks were settled on the marginal borderlands of the Tang empire between them and the Xueyantuo. More than a hundred Türks were made generals of the Tang army and officials of the Tang court above the fifth rank. Several thousand families of Türks came to dwell in Chang'an as a result of this integration of Türkic personnel.

== Aftermath ==
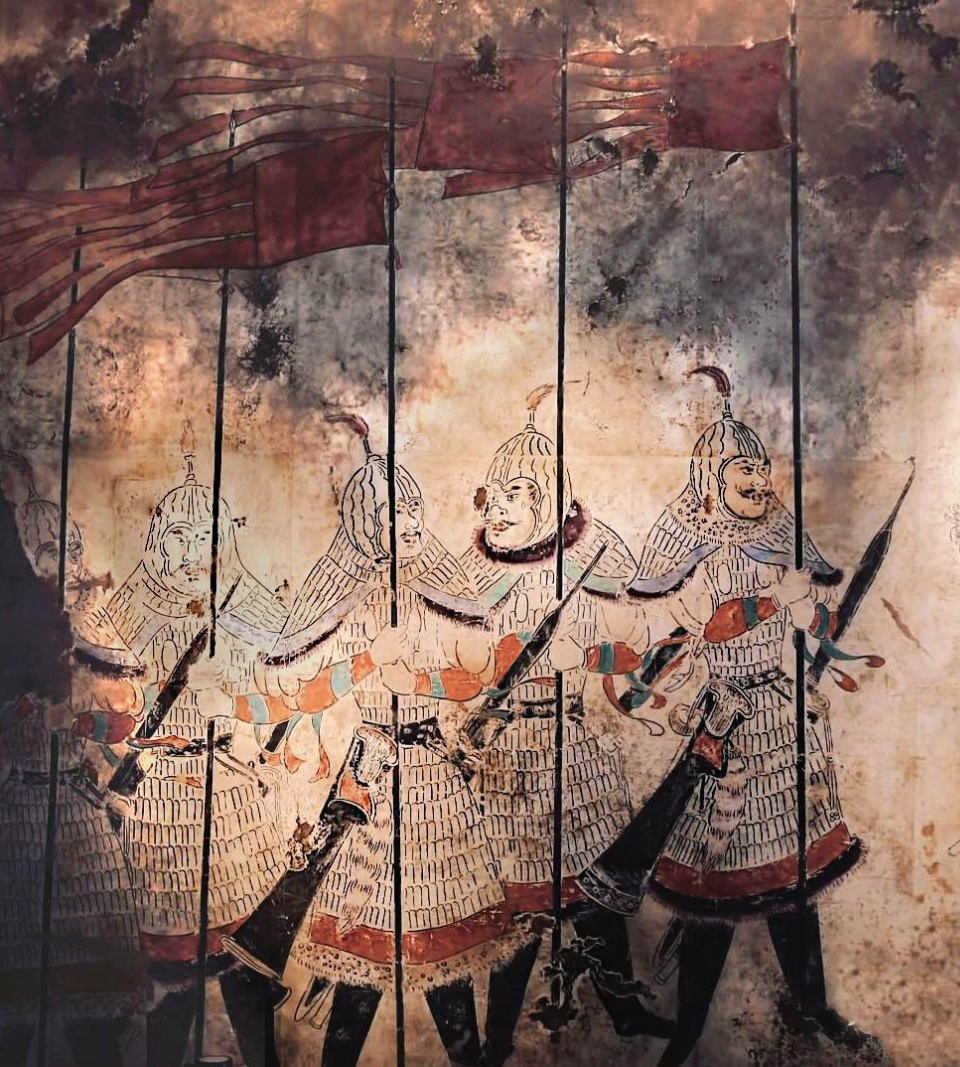
Tang honour guard

Illig was taken prisoner and spent the rest of his life in China where he died.

After the Eastern Turkic Khaganate was defeated, Zhenzhu Khan of the Xueyantuo claimed to be their successor. In response, Emperor Taizong claimed the title Tian Kehan (Khan of Heaven).

The Eastern Turks were divided into different groups and settled on the Ordos plateau south of the Yellow River. However after Ashina Jiesheshuai, the younger brother of Ashina Shibobi, made an attempt on Taizong's life, the Ashina Turks were resettled north of the Yellow River along the south of the Gobi Desert as a buffer against the Xueyantuo. Qilibi Khan was appointed as their puppet ruler. A few years later, the Xueyantuo advanced southward and the Eastern Turks retreated across the Yellow River. When Zhenzhu's successor, Duomi Khan, made plans to attack China, Taizong allied with the Uyghurs and their combined forces defeated Duomi in 646.

Taking advantage of the Xueyantuo's defeat, a junior member of the Ashina clan, Ashina Hubo, attempted to revive the Eastern Turkic Khaganate by proclaiming himself Chebi Khagan (r. 646–650). Another joint Tang-Uyghur army defeated him in 650 and took him prisoner. Two more attempts at independence by the Eastern Turks occurred under Ashina Nishufu (r. 679–680) and Ashina Funian (r. 680–681). Both were quickly brought to an end by Emperor Gaozong of Tang.

After the failures of the previous Turk rebellions, a number of tribal leaders left for Ötüken in Mongolia, including Qutlugh (later Ilterish Qaghan), a grandson of the last ruler of the Eastern Turks, Illig Qaghan. Qutlugh was named Ilterish Qaghan in 680 and with his original 200 men, they campaigned against other tribes, gathering the Turks around him. The Second Turkic Khaganate was established and within ten years, he had mounted 47 campaigns and fought 20 battles, uniting the steppes and engaging in raids on the Tang dynasty. He died in 692 and was succeeded by his brother, Qapaghan Qaghan.

== See also ==
- Emperor Taizong's campaign against Xueyantuo
- Tang campaigns against the Western Turks
- Tang dynasty in Inner Asia
- Transition from Sui to Tang
- Turks in the Tang military
