= Yinshania =

Scientific classification
- Kingdom: Plantae
- Clade: Tracheophytes
- Clade: Angiosperms
- Clade: Eudicots
- Clade: Rosids
- Order: Brassicales
- Family: Brassicaceae
- Tribe: Yinshanieae
- Genus: Yinshania; Ma & Y.Z.Zhao

Species
- See text

Synonyms
- Chuanxinia Y.Z.Zhao; Cochleariella Y.H.Zhang & Vogt; Cochleariopsis Y.H.Zhang; Hilliella (O.E.Schulz) Y.H.Zhang & H.W.Li

Genus of Brassicaceae plants

Yinshania (Chinese: 阴山荠属, meaning Yinshan shepherd's purse) is a genus of flowering plants in the crucifer family Brassicaceae, native to China (including Taiwan) and northern Vietnam. Some species in Yinshania are diploid, while the polyploid species were proposed to be placed in a separate genus, Hilliella. Plants of the World Online includes Hilliella within Yinshania.

== Species ==
12 species are accepted.

- Yinshania acutangula (O.E.Schulz) Y.H.Zhang
- Yinshania fumarioides (Dunn) Y.Z.Zhao (Note: Member of proposed genus Hilliella)
- Yinshania henryi (Oliv.) Y.H.Zhang
- Yinshania hui (O.E.Schulz) Y.Z.Zhao
- Yinshania hunanensis (Y.H.Zhang) Al-Shehbaz, G.Yang, L.L.Lu & T.Y.Cheo
- Yinshania lichuanensis (Y.H.Zhang) Al-Shehbaz, G.Yang, L.L.Lu & T.Y.Cheo
- Yinshania paradoxa (Hance) Y.Z.Zhao
- Yinshania rivulorum (Dunn) Al-Shehbaz, G.Yang, L.L.Lu & T.Y.Cheo
- Yinshania rupicola (D.C.Zhang & J.Z.Shao) Al-Shehbaz, G.Yang, L.L.Lu & T.Y.Cheo
- Yinshania sinuata (K.C.Kuan) Al-Shehbaz, G.Yang, L.L.Lu & T.Y.Cheo
- Yinshania yixianensis (Y.H.Zhang) Al-Shehbaz, G.Yang, L.L.Lu & T.Y.Cheo
- Yinshania zayuensis Y.H.Zhang

=== Formerly placed here ===
- Bifurcipilus furcatopilosus (K.C.Kuan) Y.Z.Zhao – as Yinshania furcatopilosa (K.C.Kuan) Y.H.Zhang
