= Tolis Qaghan =

Tolis Qaghan or Tolis Khagan (Chinese: 突利可汗, Old Turkic: 𐱅𐰇𐰠𐰾𐰴𐰍𐰣, Töles qaγan) may refer to:

- Yami Qaghan (died 609), personal name Ashina Jankan (阿史那染干), a khagan of Eastern Turkic Khaganate, known in some point as Tolis Qaghan
- Tolis Qaghan (603–631), personal name Ashina Shibobi (阿史那什钵苾), son of Shibi Qaghan and thus a grandson of the man above, a khagan of Eastern Turkic Khaganate when the khaganate was defeated and became a vassal of Tang dynasty
