= Li Cheng =

Li Cheng may refer to:

- Li Cheng (painter) (李成; 919–967), Chinese painter
- Li Cheng (Tang Dynasty) (李程; 761–837), official of the Chinese Tang Dynasty
- Lê Trừng (黎澄; 1374–1446), Vietnamese official who later served in the Chinese Ming dynasty
- Li Cheng (author), Chinese-American Christian pastor, author of Youzi Yin
- Cheng Li or Li Cheng (李成), Chinese-American political scientist

== See also ==
- Li Ching (disambiguation)
