= Li Jing =

Li Jing or Jing Li may refer to:

== Surname Li ==
- Li Jing (deity), fictional character in Fengshen Yanyi
- Li Jing (Tang dynasty) (571–649), general during the Tang dynasty
- Li Jing (Southern Tang) (916–961), ruler of the Southern Tang dynasty
- Li Jing (PRC general) (born 1930), general in the People's Liberation Army of China
- Li Ching (actress) (1948–2018), China-born Hong Kong actress
- Li Jing (TV presenter) (born 1962), Taiwanese television show hostess and model
- Jing Li (chemist), China-born chemist and professor at Rutgers University
- Jing Ulrich (born 1967), née Li, managing director and vice chairman of Asia Pacific at JPMorgan Chase
- Joseph Li Jing (born 1968), Chinese Roman Catholic bishop
- Li Jing (actor) (born 1978), Chinese xiangsheng and film actor

=== Sportspeople ===
- Li Jing (gymnast) (born 1970), Chinese gymnast, world champion and Olympic medalist
- Li Ching (table tennis) (born 1975), China-born Hong Kong table tennis player
- Li Jing (volleyball) (born 1991), Chinese volleyball player

== Surname Jing ==
- Ching Li (1945–2017), Hong Kong actress

== See also ==
- Book of Rites, also known as Classic of Rites (禮經; Li Jing), a Chinese classic text
- Li Ching (disambiguation)
