= Illig Qaghan =

Last qaghan of the Eastern Turkic Khaganate

Illig Khagan
- Fourth Khagan of the Eastern Turkic Khaganate
- Reign: 620–630
- Predecessor: Chulou Qaghan
- Successor: None
- Born: Ashina Duobi 阿史那咄苾
- Died: 13 February 634
- Spouse: Princess Yicheng (義成公主)
- Issue: Yukuk Shad
Posthumous name
- Huang (荒)
- House: Ashina
- Father: Yami Qaghan
- Mother: Poshi 婆施
- Religion: Tengrism

Illig Qaghan (Old Turkic: 𐰃𐰞𐰞𐰃𐰏𐰴𐰍𐰣; simplified Chinese: 颉利可汗; traditional Chinese: 頡利可汗; pinyin: Jiélì Kèhán; died 13 February 634), born Ashina Duobi (Chinese: 阿史那咄苾; pinyin: Āshǐnà Duōbì), posthumous name Prince Huang of Guiyi (歸義荒王), was the last qaghan of the Eastern Turkic Khaganate.

== Background ==
Illig Qaghan was a son of Yami Qaghan and his Tuyuhun wife Poshi (婆施). He was raised by the Tuyuhun general Külüg Tarkhan (胡祿達官). After coming of age, he was given the title Baghatur Shad (莫賀咄設) and was assigned to rule the eastern parts of the empire.

== Reign ==
He declared himself Illig Qaghan, ruler of the Eastern Turkic Khaganate, after the death of his older brother Chuluo and married his brother's widow. He gave his nephew Ashina Shibobi the title of Tolis Qaghan afterwards and assigned him to his own former tribes. He continued his predecessors' pro-Sui politics, supporting puppet emperors.

== Raids into Tang China ==
His first contacts with the Tang were very hostile. In 621, Turkic forces attacked Fenyin and Xi territories, reaching as far south as Yanmen in April. In response, Turkic ambassadors were arrested in China and vice versa. In May, Illig's forces crushed Tang forces commanded by Li Shuliang (李叔良), Emperor Gaozu's cousin who died from arrow wounds after a month. They were repelled later by Yang Shidao.

Later raids were accompanied by Gao Kaidao and Yuan Junzhang (苑君璋), a general formerly under Liu Wuzhou. To stop the raids, Gaozu offered Illig tribute and a Chinese princess. He accepted the proposal and both states released the arrested envoys.

The raids started again in 623. Illig was assisted by Gao Kaidao and Liu Heita in sieging and capturing Mayi (present-day Shuozhou, Shanxi). Yuan Junzhang was appointed governor of Mayi. But Mayi was soon returned to the Tang by Illig in hopes of attaining a marriage to a Tang princess.

Later Liang Luoren (梁洛仁), the brother of Liang Shidu attacked Ling prefecture with assistance from the Eastern Turks. However Li Daozong (a cousin of Taizong) repelled him, and expelled the Illig's nephew Ashina Yushe (阿史那郁射) from the Wuyuan (五原, in modern Yulin, Shaanxi).

As raids were becoming more frequent in 624, Li Shimin stepped up to accuse Ashina Shibobi of breaking his brotherhood vows, which made Illig Qaghan grow suspicious of Shibobi. Illig soon attempted to seek peace, sending his uncle Ashina Simo and Ashina Shibobi to negotiate.

In 625, Illig Qaghan attacked Ling Prefecture (靈州, roughly modern Yinchuan, Ningxia). Emperor Gaozu sent the general Zhang Jin (張瑾) to fight the Turks with Wen Yanbo serving as Zhang's secretary general. When Zhang engaged Illig, however, he suffered a major defeat, and Wen was captured. As Wen was an important official, Illig interrogated him and asked about the strengths and weaknesses of the Tang state. Wen refused to answer and Illig moved him to the Yin Mountains.

In 626, just 19 days after Emperor Taizong took the throne, Shibobi and Illig were just across the Wei River from Chang'an. Emperor Taizong, accompanied by Gao Shilian and Fang Xuanling, met the Turks across the river and personally negotiated peace terms, which included giving tribute to Eastern Turks, before Illig withdrew.

== Civil war ==
In 627 he attempted to levy horses from the vassal Tiele tribes after all his livestock died from a snowstorm. The Tiele revolted under a Xueyantuo coalition. Emperor Taizong of Tang wasted no time in allying with these Tiele and the Khitans in a joint attack. Illig was already facing internal dissent from the Göktürk generals jealous of the influence of Illig's Sogdian viziers.

In response, Illig gave 100,000 cavalry to Yukuk Shad to suppress the revolts. However Yukuk was defeated by Huige forces commanded by Pusa (菩薩) near Malie (near modern Gansu). Later, more Turkic generals were defeated by the Xueyantuo.

In 628 Kumo Xi tribes also rose in rebellion against the Eastern Turks. Eastern governor Ashina Shibobi was unsuccessful in defeating rebels, which made Illig angry and ordered him to be flogged and imprisoned for 10 days. Taizong used this opportunity to invite him to flee to the Tang.

== End of reign ==
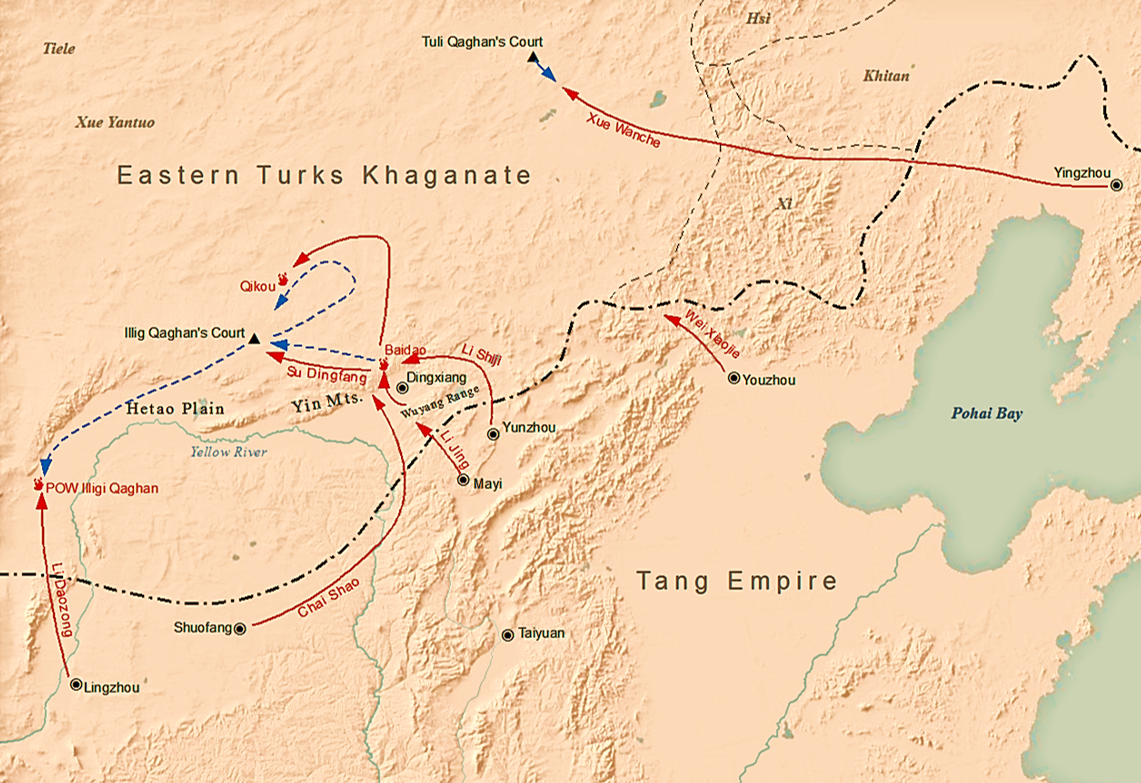
Tang dynasty's campaign against illig Qaghan in 629–630

In the summer of 628, when a number of Khitan tribes surrendered to the Tang, Illig offered to trade Liang Shidu for the Khitan tribes, but Emperor Taizong refused stating Liang was already on verge of surrendering himself and the Khitan were not Turks. Meanwhile, Emperor Taizong sent his brother-in-law Chai Shao and the generals Xue Wanjun (薛萬均), Liu Lancheng (劉蘭成), and Liu Min (Liang's former subordinate) to pressure Shuofang. They soon defeated the Eastern Turkic forces and put Shuofang under siege, and Eastern Turkic forces were unable to lift the siege. When the food supplies ran out, Liang Shidu's cousin Liang Luoren assassinated Liang Shidu and surrendered the city to the Tang.

Around the new year 630, with the Eastern Turkic Khaganate in internal turmoil, Illig attacked Ashina Shibobi. In response Emperor Taizong commissioned Li Jing, Li Shiji, Wei Xiaojie, Li Daozong, Chai Shao, and Xue Wanche (薛萬徹) to attack the Eastern Turkic Khaganate, with Li Jing in overall command. Li launched a surprise attack from Mayi through Wuyang Range (惡陽嶺, in modern southern Hohhot, Inner Mongolia), capturing the important city of Dingxiang (定襄, in modern Hohhot). In fear, Illig retreated to Qikou (磧口, in modern Xilin Gol League, Inner Mongolia). Li Jing then sent secret messengers to persuade his associate to surrender. One of them, Kangsumi (康蘇密), took Emperor Yang's wife Empress Xiao and their grandson Yang Zhengdao, whom Chuluo Khagan had made Prince of Sui, and surrendered to Li Jing. Illig sent messengers to Emperor Taizong, offering to submit and to pay homage to him later, but was still considering fleeing further with his forces. Emperor Taizong sent the official Tang Jian as an envoy to Illig, but also ordered Li Jing to escort him. Li Jing, reading between the lines and believing that Emperor Taizong's order was to attack Illig. And after joining forces with Li Shiji, launched the attack. They defeated and captured most of Illig's remaining forces and killed his wife, Sui's Princess Yicheng. Illig fled further, and was soon captured by his own men Ashina Sunishi (阿史那蘇尼失) and Ashina Nishu who handed him over to Li Daozong and Zhang Baoxiang (張寶相). He was brought back to Chang'an to face Taizong on 29 March, 630. After listing his crimes against the Tang, Taizong spared him.

== Later years ==
In his later years, the former Illig grew ill in morale. In 632 Taizong made him a commander and appointed to be a governor of Guó Prefecture which was rich with deer, but he declined. He died in February 634 and was made Prince of Guiyi (歸義王) and posthumously named Huang (荒) by Taizong. His teacher Kulug Tarkhan was also reported to have taken his own life in sadness. Cen Wenben was ordered to carve a memorial stone.

== Family ==
He was married to Princess Yicheng of Sui and a number of wives. He had at least five children:

- Ashina Dieluozhi (阿史那疊羅支) - he was captured by alongside his mother Li Jing in 630. Taizong reportedly told about him "filial respect for mother and father is same for every person be it Chinese or non-Chinese". He died single.
- Ashina Yukuk - he was the ruling prince of the Tiele tribes before 627, he would later go on to be khagan of the Western Turkic Khaganate.
- Ashina Poluomen (阿史那婆羅門) - lived between 610 and 651. He was a general in Tang army. His tomb was found in October 2005, near Xi'an.
- Ashina Tegin (阿史那特勤) - yabgu of Eastern Tujue.
  - Ashina Jian (阿史那暕, 629–671) - a Tang general, Commandant of the Left Guard.
    - Ashina Gande (阿史那感徳) - a Prince of Guiyi (歸義王), lived between 664 and 691. Married an Ashide woman.
- Etmish Beg - Ilterish Qaghan, founder of Second Turkic Kaghanate was a descendant of Illig through Etmish Beg. Some scholars such as Vladimir Sychev suggest he was same person as Ashina Nishufu.

== Sources ==
- Lev Gumilev. The Gokturks. Moscow, 1967.

== See also ==
- Emperor Taizong's campaign against Eastern Tujue

Illig Qaghan Ashina Clan
Preceded by Chulo Qaghan	Khagan of the Eastern Turkic Khaganate; 620–630	Succeeded by Qilibi Qaghan
