= Lijin =

Lijin or Likin may refer to:

- Likin (taxation) (厘金/禮金), system of internal tariffs in China during the late Qing dynasty
- Lijin County (利津县), of Dongying City, Shandong, China
- Lijin Town (利津镇), seat of Lijin County
- Lijin, Iran (ليجين), a village in East Azerbaijan Province, Iran
