= Bifurcipilus =

Scientific classification
- Kingdom: Plantae
- Clade: Tracheophytes
- Clade: Angiosperms
- Clade: Eudicots
- Clade: Rosids
- Order: Brassicales
- Family: Brassicaceae
- Genus: Bifurcipilus; Y.Z.Zhao
- Species: B. furcatopilosus

Binomial name
- Bifurcipilus furcatopilosus (K.C.Kuan) Y.Z.Zhao

Synonyms
- Cochlearia furcatopilosa K.C.Kuan (1980) (species basionym); Yinshania furcatopilosa (K.C.Kuan) Y.H.Zhang

Genus of flowering plants

Bifurcipilus is a genus of flowering plants in the mustard family, Brassicaceae. It includes a single species, Bifurcipilus furcatopilosus, an annual native to Hubei province in south-central China.

The species was first described as Cochlearia furcatopilosa by Ke Chien Kuan in 1980. In 1987 Yu Hua Zhang placed the species in genus Yinshania as Yinshania furcatopilosa. In 2018 Yi Zhi Zhao placed the species in the newly described monotypic genus Bifurcipilus as Bifurcipilus furcatopilosus.
