= Jinli =

Street in Chengdu, Sichuan, China

Coordinates: 30°38′55″N 104°02′51″E

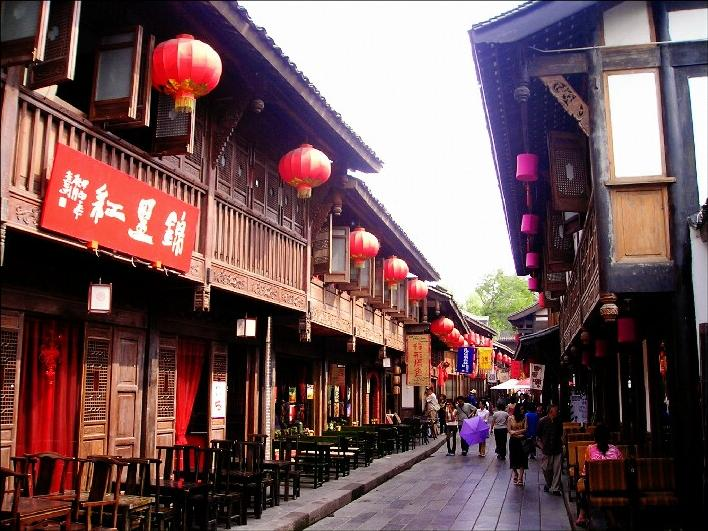
Jinli Street

Jinli (Chinese: 锦里古街; pinyin: jǐnlǐ gǔjiē) is a street in Chengdu, Sichuan, China. Its history can be traced back to the pre-Qin Dynasty era more than 1800 years ago. Jinli was ranked first in "the world's most beautiful streets" published by CNN Travel in 2019.

The street is about 550 meters long. It is a part of the Temple of Marquis, and the buildings are in the Qing Dynasty style. The theme is Three Kingdoms Culture, a traditional folk custom. There are many bars, inns, snack stores and souvenir shops. The street was renovated in 2004.

In 2005, Jinli was named as "National Top Ten City Commercial Pedestrian Street". In 2006, Jinli was named as "National Demonstration Base of the Cultural Industry" by the Ministry of Culture. It has achieved 18,000,000 visitors a year in 2018. Especially during the Spring Festival, more people come to visit the "Big Temple Fair".
