= Lijin, Iran =

Lijin ليجين
- Village
- Location within Iran
- Coordinates: 38°31′03″N 46°29′30″E
- Country: Iran
- Province: East Azerbaijan
- County: Varzaqan
- Bakhsh: Central
- Rural District: Sina

Population (2006)
  - Total: 277
- Time zone: UTC+3:30 (IRST)
  - Summer (DST): UTC+4:30 (IRDT)

Lijin (Persian: ليجين, also romanized as Lījīn; also known as Legīn, Lejen, Lejīn, and Lidzhim) is a village in Sina Rural District, in the Central District of Varzaqan County, East Azerbaijan Province, Iran. At the 2006 census, its population was 277, in 49 families.
