= Tang Jian =

Tang Jian 唐儉
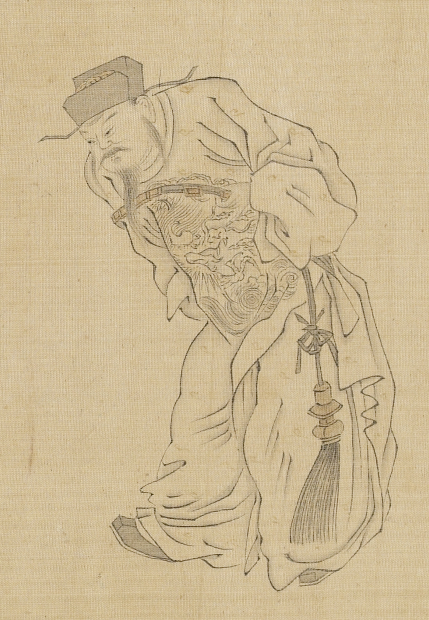
- Born: 579; Taiyuan, Shanxi
- Died: 656 (aged 76–77)
- Other names: Maoyue (茂約); Duke Xiang of Ju (莒襄公)
- Occupation: Official
- Spouse: Yuan Xingru's daughter
- Children: Tang Yishi; Tang Heshang; Tang Guan
- Father: Tang Jiàn

Tang Jian (579–656), courtesy name Maoyue, posthumously known as Duke Xiang of Ju, was a Chinese official who lived in the early Tang dynasty and rose to prominence during the reign of Emperor Taizong.

== Family ==
Tang Jian's grandfather, Tang Yong (唐邕), was the chancellor of Northern Qi dynasty. His family had a close friendship for generations with the Li family, the imperial family of the Tang dynasty; Tang Jian's father, Tang Jiàn (唐鉴), was a close ally of Emperor Gaozu (Li Yuan), the founder of the Tang dynasty.

Tang Jian was born in Jinyang (晋阳), which is present-day Taiyuan, Shanxi.

Tang Jian had three sons:

- Tang Yishi (唐义识)
- Tang Heshang (唐河上)
- Tang Guan (唐観)

== Service under Emperor Taizong ==
Tang Jian played an important diplomatic role in erasing the Eastern Tujue's power over East Asia. He was sent by Emperor Taizong to meet the Khan of the Eastern Tujue. His main task was to persuade Jiali Khan to surrender. Around the same time, the Tang army led by Li Jing attacked the Eastern Tujue by surprise, defeated them, and captured Jiali Khan.
