= Li Qing =

Li Qing may refer to:

- Li Qing (diver) (born 1972), female Chinese diver
- Li Qing (artist) (born 1981), Chinese artist
- Li Mao (715–775), formerly known as Li Qing, Imperial Prince of the Chinese Tang Dynasty
- Li Qing (actor) (born 2000), male Chinese actor
