= Li of Jin =

Li of Jin may refer to:

- Marquis Li of Jin (died 859 BC)
- Duke Li of Jin (died 573 BC)
