= Jin Li (computer scientist) =

Chinese computer scientist

- Born: 1971 (age 54–55)
- Education: Tsinghua University
- Scientific career
- Workplaces: Microsoft Research
- Thesis: (1994)
- Website: www.microsoft.com/en-us/research/people/jinl/

Jin Li (Chinese: 李劲; pinyin: Lǐ Jìn; born 1971) is a Chinese computer scientist. He joined Microsoft Research in 1999, as one of the founding member of Microsoft Research Asia. He is currently a Partner Research Manager at Microsoft Research, Redmond.

== Life and work ==
Li was born in Shanghai, China.

In 1984, he demoed computer programs to Deng Xiaoping, then the paramount leader of the People's Republic of China. This iconic event led to the quote "计算机的普及要从娃娃抓起" (Computer education should start from children). This event and quote was widely reported in China, often in the context of teaching computer programming to children, and/or developing computer industry in China.

In 1987, Li matriculated at Tsinghua University at the age of 16. He got PhD in 1994. He was considered one of the youngest PhDs in China in the 20th century.

Li joined Integrated Media Systems Center of University of Southern California in 1994 as an Associate Researcher. In 1996, he joined Sharp Laboratories of America. In 1999, he joined Microsoft Research Asia as one of its founding member , and won a Microsoft Gold Star award for his contribution in founding the lab. He returned to Microsoft Research Redmond in 2001, where he served as the Partner Research Manager for the Cloud Computing and Storage group.

Li made extensive contribution to Multimedia compression standard (JPEG 2000, MPEG-4, HEVC), on topics of optimized scalable coding, visual optimization in scalable coding, coding of object of non-rectangular shape, , region-of-interest interactive image browsing, scalable audio coding, and bi-directional motion compensation He was a pioneer in P2P video delivery . His work on the Local Reconstruction Code (LRC) has shipped in Azure Storage, which has led to hundreds of millions dollars of saving to Microsoft per annum , a Best Paper Award at USENIX ATC 2012 , and a Microsoft TCN Storage Technical Achievement Award. LRC has also been used in Storage Space (shipped in Windows & Windows Server) . His work on Data Deduplication in Windows Server 2012 is among the top 3 File Server features introduced . It has received rave press reviews . His work to exploit the benefit of SSD for high performance storage applications has led to "FlashStore" and SkimpyStash , the former has been shipped in Bing/AdCenter for cloud object storage, the latter has been incorporated into BW-Tree, which is shipping in SQL Server 2014 (Hekaton) and Azure DocumentDB. He developed RemoteFX for WAN, , which provides a fast and fluid user experience in a remote session for Windows running over any WAN and wireless networks.

Li is the leader of the open source project Prajna and DL Workspace . Prajna is an Apache Spark-like distributed computational platform on .Net. DL Workspace is an open sourced toolkit that empower AI scientists to quickly spin up a cloud AI infrastructure (either in public cloud, such as Microsoft Azure, Amazon Web Services, Google Compute Engine, or in an on-perm cluster ) to manage AI training, interactive exploration, inference, and analytics. DL Workspace supports all major Deep Learning toolkit out of box (e.g., TensorFlow, PyTorch, Caffe (software), CNTK, etc..).

Li was the program chair for ACM Multimedia 2016 and ICME steering committee chair ( 2014-2015). He is an IEEE Fellow.
