= Feng Bingcheng =

Chinese-born American pastor (1941–2026)

Feng Bingcheng (冯秉诚) (December 23, 1941 – July 21, 2026 ) was a Chinese-born American pastor based in Wisconsin. He is best known for his book Youzi Yin (游子吟; 'Song of a Wanderer') written under the pen name Li Cheng (里程). The book is largely autobiographical, expressing Feng's personal testimony as a science post-graduate student and former atheist. The book was originally published in Chinese by the American Chinese Christian group Ambassadors for Christ (AFC) founded in 1969 by Moses Chow and based since 1974 in Paradise, PA. The 8th edition (2010) claimed that 780,000 copies had been distributed - making it one of the most widely read modern Chinese American Christian books. The book was translated into English as Song of a Wanderer - Beckoned by Eternity in 2002.
