= Li Shiji =

Chinese Tang dynasty general (594–669)

Li Shiji 李世勣
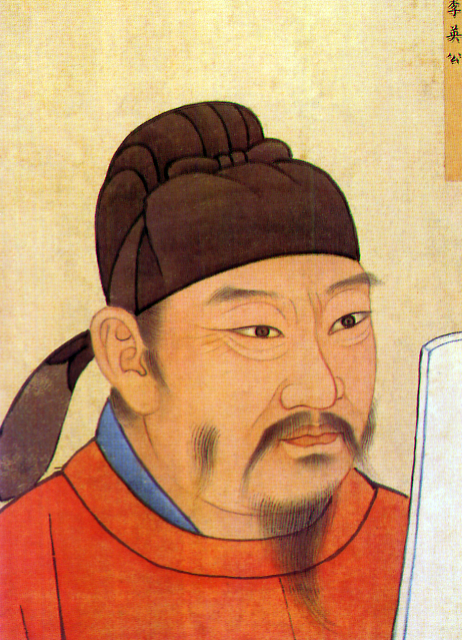
- Portrait of Li Shiji
- Born: 594; Dongming County, Shandong, Sui China
- Died: December 31, 669 (aged 75); Xi'an, Shaanxi, Tang China
- Other names: Maogong (懋功/茂功); Xu Shiji (徐世勣); Li Ji (李勣); Duke Zhenwu of Ying (英貞武公)
- Occupations: Military general, politician
- Children: Li Zhen; Li Siwen; two daughters
- Father: Xu Gai
- Relatives: Li Bi (brother); Li Gan (brother); two sisters

Li Shiji (594? (Note: In his Zizhi Tongjian Kaoyi, Sima Guang recorded the various discrepancies regarding Li Shiji's age, and that he used the account found in Tang Shilu for Zizhi Tongjian.) – 31 December 669), courtesy name Maogong, posthumously known as Duke Zhenwu of Ying, was a Chinese military general and politician who lived in the early Tang dynasty. His original family name was Xú, but he was later given the family name of the Tang imperial clan, Li, by Emperor Gaozu, the Tang dynasty's founding emperor. Later, during the reign of Emperor Gaozong, Li Shiji was known as Li Ji (i.e. the "Shi" in his name was omitted) to avoid naming taboo because the personal name of Emperor Gaozong's predecessor, Emperor Taizong (Li Shimin), had the same Chinese character "Shi". Li Shiji is also referred to as Xu Maogong (his original family name and his courtesy name combined) and Xu Ji in the historical novels Shuo Tang and Sui Tang Yanyi.

Li Shiji was initially a follower of Li Mi, one of the rebel rulers rebelling against the preceding Sui dynasty, and he submitted to the Tang Empire after Li Mi did so, upon which Emperor Gaozu, impressed with his loyalty to Li Mi, granted him the imperial family name "Li". He later participated in destroying Xu Yuanlang and Fu Gongshi, two of the Tang Empire's competitors in the campaign to reunify China. During the reign of Emperor Gaozu's son and successor, Emperor Taizong, Li Shiji participated in the successful campaigns against the Göktürks and Xueyantuo, allowing the Tang Empire to become the dominant power in eastern Asia, and also served as a chancellor. During the reign of Emperor Gaozong, he served as chancellor and the commander of the army against Goguryeo, destroying it in 668. He died the next year. He and Li Jing were considered the two most prominent early Tang generals.

== Early life ==
Xu Shiji was probably born in 594. His clan was originally from Cao Province (曹州, roughly modern Heze, Shandong), but late in the Sui dynasty moved to Hua Province (滑州, roughly modern Anyang, Henan). Xu Shiji's father Xu Gai (徐蓋) was a member of the landed gentry, and both he and Xu Shiji were said to be generous, using the food yields of their land to help others regardless of whether those were related to them.

== Service under Zhai Rang and Li Mi ==
Around 616, Zhai Rang gathered a group of men to resist the rule of Emperor Yang. Xu Shiji joined Zhai, and suggested to him that instead of pillaging the people of the region, which Zhai had done to maintain himself and his own men, it was inappropriate to be robbing people of their homeland. Rather, he suggested that, as there were plenty of travellers on the Grand Canal, they should rob travellers instead. Zhai agreed, and their pillaging raids instead targeted travellers and official messengers. Many people joined Zhai, and when the key Sui general Zhang Xutuo (張須陀), who had defeated many agrarian rebels, attacked, Xu killed Zhang in battle late in 616, allowing Zhai to become even more acclaimed. Around this time, he also became close friends with another general under Zhai, Shan Xiongxin (單雄信), swearing to be brothers and to die on the same day.

Meanwhile, Li Mi, the strategist for the Sui general Yang Xuangan, who unsuccessfully rebelled against Emperor Yang in 613, was visiting rebel generals in the region, seeking to sell his grand strategy to destroy Sui. As Li Mi was of noble birth, and there had been prophecies that the next emperor would be named Li, there began to be thoughts among the rebels that Li might be destined to be the next emperor. Xu Shiji and another close associate of Zhai's, Wang Bodang (王伯當), thus persuaded Zhai to support Li Mi as leader. Zhai agreed, and after the victory over Zhang, the rebels approached the eastern capital Luoyang and declared Li Mi their leader, with the title of Duke of Wei. Xu was given a major general title, while Zhai served as prime minister. After Xu achieved a victory over the Sui general Wang Shichong, whom Emperor Yang had sent to reinforce Luoyang, Li Mi created Xu the Duke of Donghai. At Xu's suggestion, Li Mi captured a major food storage—Liyang Storage (黎陽倉, in modern Hebi, Henan)—and after doing so, opened up the storage to allow people in the region suffering from famines to take food. As a result, more than 200,000 men joined Li Mi within about 10 days, and a number of commanderies submitted to him, including the major rebel generals Dou Jiande and Zhu Can.

In winter 617, with a conflict between Li Mi and Zhai intensifying, Li Mi set an ambush for Zhai at a feast held for him, killing him, his brother Zhai Hong (翟弘), his nephew Zhai Mohou (翟摩侯), and his strategist Wang Ruxin (王儒信). During the ambush, Xu was injured in his neck and nearly died. Li Mi, declared, however, that his intention was only to execute Zhai Rang, and no one other than the Zhai clan was to worry. He personally attended to Xu's injuries, and had Xu, Shan, and Wang Bodang take over Zhai's troops.

In spring 618, Emperor Yang was killed at Jiangdu (in modern Yangzhou, Jiangsu) in a coup led by the general Yuwen Huaji. Yuwen soon abandoned Jiangdu and headed back north, toward Luoyang, with the elite Xiaoguo (驍果) Army, leading to comprehension both at Luoyang (where Sui officials had declared Emperor Yang's grandson Yang Tong the Prince of Yue emperor) and at Li Mi's headquarters. The enemies made peace, with Li Mi nominally submitting to Yang Tong, as both sides prepared for a joint confrontation with Yuwen. As part of this arrangement, Xu also received a major Sui general title. Li Mi, who had become somewhat alienated with Xu due to Xu's criticism that he was not sufficiently rewarding the soldiers, put Xu in charge of defending Liyang Storage, and Yuwen subsequently put Liyang under siege, but Xu was not only able to withstand the siege but further fought Yuwen outside, defeating him.

Later in 618, Wang Shichong, who had opposed the peace agreement with Li Mi, killed the other key officials Lu Chu (盧楚) and Yuan Wendu (元文都), who had advocated peace with Li Mi. Another official who supported the peace, Huangfu Wuyi (皇甫無逸), fled to Chang'an and surrendered to the newly established the Tang dynasty. Wang seized power as regent. Hearing what had happened, Li Mi broke off peaceful relations with Yang Tong's regime. However, he did not pay close attention to Wang, and Wang soon defeated him in a surprise attack, seizing most of his troops. Initially, after the defeat, Li Mi considered fleeing to Xu, at Liyang, but was warned by some that Xu had nearly died when he killed Zhai and thus could not be trusted. Instead, Li Mi fled to Chang'an and surrendered to Tang.

Xu, upon hearing that Li Mi had fled to Chang'an, took effective control of Li Mi's former territory, and as Li Mi had surrendered to Tang, he decided to submit to Tang as well, but stated to his secretary Guo Xiaoke (郭孝恪):

The Duke of Wei has submitted to Tang. These people and this land are all owned by the Duke of Wei. If I submit them to Tang, I am benefiting from my lord's defeat and making it into my own accomplishment to receive glory, and I would be ashamed of that. Now, let us record the names of the prefectures and counties, as well as the census rolls of the military as well and submit them to the Duke of Wei. Let him offer them himself, and these will be considered his accomplishments.

He therefore sent Guo to Chang'an to report to Li Mi. Emperor Gaozu of Tang heard that Xu had sent messengers, but with no petitions to submit to Tang, only reports for Li Mi, and was surprised. He summoned Guo and questioned him, and Guo relayed what Xu's intents were. Emperor Gaozu was impressed and stated, "Xu Shiji remembers his lord and surrenders his accomplishments, and is really a pure-hearted subject." He thus bestowed the imperial clan name of Li (which he shared with Li Mi) on Xu, who thereafter would be known as Li Shiji. He also created Li Shiji the Duke of Cao and his father Xu Gai (thereafter known as Li Gai as well) the Prince of Jiyin, although Li Gai declined the honor and was subsequently created the Duke of Shu. Li Shiji remained in charge of the Liyang region to resist against Wang and Dou Jiande.

== During Emperor Gaozu's reign ==
Around the new year 619, Li Mi, wanting to revive his independence, rebelled against Tang but was soon killed by the Tang general Sheng Yanshi (盛彥師). Emperor Gaozu sent messengers to Li Shiji explaining why Li Mi was killed. Li Shiji mourned Li Mi and requested that he be allowed to bury Li Mi with honor. Emperor Gaozu agreed and sent Li Mi's body to Li Shiji. Li Shiji, still using ceremonies due a ruler, buried Li Mi in a grand funeral south of Liyang.

In fall 619, Dou Jiande, then with the title of Prince of Xia, launched a major offensive, set to affirm his control of the territory north of the Yellow River, as a number of cities there had submitted to Tang. After a number of Xia victories, Li Shentong (李神通) the Prince of Huai'an, Emperor Gaozu's cousin who was in charge of Tang operations north of the Yellow River, withdrew to Liyang and joined forces with Li Shiji. When Dou then was on the way to attack Tang's Wei Prefecture (衛州, roughly modern Weihui, Henan), Li Shiji tried to ambush him, and his officer Qiu Xiaogang (丘孝剛) nearly killed Dou before Dou's guards killed him. In anger, Dou turned his attack around and attacked Liyang instead, capturing it and seizing Li Shentong, Li Gai, Wei Zheng, and Emperor Gaozu's sister Princess Tong'an. Li Shiji was able to fight his way out, but several days later, because his father Li Gai had been captured, surrendered to Dou. Dou made Li Shiji a general and still kept him in charge of Liyang, but took Li Gai back to the Xia capital Ming Prefecture (洺州, in modern Handan, Hebei) to serve as a hostage. He also put Li Shentong under house arrest, as an honored guest.

Li Shiji soon considered how he could again submit to Tang, but worried that Dou would kill his father Li Gai. Guo Xiaoke suggested to him that he needed to first gain Dou's trust by accomplishing things for Xia. Li Shiji agreed, and in winter 619, he attacked the city of Huojia (in modern Xinxiang, Henan), held by Wang Shichong (who had by that point had Yang Tong yield the throne to him, ending Sui and establishing a new state of Zheng) and captured much goods and persons to present to Dou, including Dou's childhood friend Liu Heita. (Note: Whether Li Shiji captured Liu Heita, however, was disputed among traditional historians, although the majority view was that he did. See Liu's article for more details.) Dou began to trust him. Li Shiji then suggested to Dou that he should attack the agrarian leader Meng Haigong (孟海公), who was then nominally submitting to Zheng, arguing that if Xia could first capture Meng's holdings, it could then next have designs on Zheng. Dou agreed, and he sent his brother-in-law Cao Dan (曹旦) south across the Yellow River, joining forces with Li Shiji. Dou himself would follow, and Li Shiji planned that, as soon as Dou himself arrived, he would ambush Dou's camp and kill him, and then try to find and save his father Li Gai. However, at this time, Dou was awaiting his wife Empress Cao's giving birth and did not arrive for a while. Meanwhile, Cao Dan was insulting and pillaging the other rebel leaders south of the Yellow River who had submitted to Xia, and the rebel leaders were all resentful. One of them, Li Shanghu (李商胡), and Li Shanghu's mother Lady Huo, urged Li Shiji to carry out his plan as soon as possible, and when Li Shiji hesitated, Li Shanghu and Lady Huo acted on their own, ambushing Cao Dan, but while they killed many of Cao's generals, Cao himself was not harmed and soon prepared to counterattack. Li Shanghu notified Li Shiji and asked him to attack Cao, but Li Shiji, saw that Cao had already taken precautions, fled to Tang territory with Guo. Cao soon defeated and killed Li Shanghu, but when Dou's officials suggested that Li Gai be executed, Dou remarked, "Li Shiji was a Tang subject. He was captured by us, but still remembered his former lord and was faithful. What sin did his father have?" Dou then spared Li Gai.

In spring 620, Li Shiji served under Emperor Gaozu's son Li Shimin the Prince of Qin in resisting a major offensive by Liu Wuzhou the Dingyang Khan, and in an engagement against Liu's general Song Jin'gang (宋金剛), Li Shiji was unsuccessful, but was saved by Li Shimin. Li Shimin eventually defeated Liu, forcing Liu to flee to Eastern Tujue.

In winter 620, with Li Shimin having launched a major offensive against Wang's Zheng state, the Zheng general Yang Qing (楊慶, a Sui imperial prince) surrendered Guan Prefecture (管州, in modern Zhengzhou, Henan), and Li Shimin sent Li Shiji to take over Guan Prefecture. When Wang Shichong's son and crown prince, Wang Xuanying (王玄應), heard of this, he headed to Guan from Hulao, but Li Shiji repelled him, and then had Guo write a letter to Wei Lu (魏陸), Zheng's prefect of Ying Prefecture (滎州, also in modern Zhengzhou), to persuade Wei to surrender. Wei did so, and this eventually led to a chain reaction where Zheng's holdings in modern eastern Henan surrendered one by one. Wang Xuanying, in fear, fled back to the Zheng capital Luoyang. Further, in spring 621, Wang Shichong's officer Shen Yue (沈悅) surrendered to Li Shiji, allowing Li Shiji's subordinate general Wang Junkuo (王君廓) to capture Hulao and capture Wang Shichong's nephew, Wang Xingben (王行本) the Prince of Jing.

Soon, however, with Zheng in desperate straits, Wang sought aid from Dou. Dou, believing that if Tang destroyed Zheng that his own Xia state would be cornered, agreed, and he sent his forward troops first while proceeding with his main troops later. In the engagement with Dou's forward troops, Li Shimin had Li Shiji, Chen Zhijie (程知節), and Qin Shubao lead the troops, and they were able to defeat Dou's forward troops. Li Shimin then wrote Dou to persuade him to stop aiding Zheng, but Dou did not relent. In summer 621, Li Shimin engaged Dou at the Battle of Hulao, defeating and capturing him. Wang, believing further resistance to be futile, surrendered. Li Shimin spared Wang, but put a number of Zheng officials that he considered treacherous to death. Li Shiji's sworn brother Shan Xiongxin, whom Li Shimin considered treacherous because Shan had turned against Li Mi, was set to be executed as well. Li Shiji begged Li Shimin to spare Shan, arguing that Shan was a capable general who could be useful to Tang and offering to surrender all of his own honors to save Shan from death. Li Shimin refused. When Shan invoked the pledge they made to die on the same day, however, Li Shiji stated to him that he had already offered his body to the service of the state and that the body was no longer his—and that, if he died as well, no one would be around to take care of Shan's wife and children—therefore refused to die as well, but cut off a piece of his leg muscle, cooked it, and had Shan eat it, stating, "Let my flesh turn to dust along with you, my brother. By this, I can at least fulfill part of the pledge." Later that year, when Li Shimin returned to Chang'an, and Emperor Gaozu let his troops march in succession in great honor, Li Shiji was one of the 25 generals honored, permitted to wear the same golden armor that Li Shimin was clad in and to offer the captives at Tang's imperial ancestral temple. He was also united with his father Li Gai, who managed to survive the collapse of the Xia regime and return to Tang territory.

Xia territory was temporarily taken over by Tang, but in fall 621, Liu Heita rose against Tang, declaring that he was avenging Dou (whom Emperor Gaozu had executed). Liu quickly captured most of former Xia territory, and when Liu approached the former Xia capital Ming Prefecture, Li Shiji, who was then at nearby Zongcheng (宗城), abandoned Zongcheng and entered Ming to assist its defense, but despite that, Liu defeated him and captured Ming, seizing it as his capital and forcing Li Shiji to flee. Li Shiji subsequently served under Li Shimin in attacking Liu, who had by now declared himself the Prince of Handong, in spring 622, and in a battle, Li Shiji's officer Pan Mao (潘毛) killed Liu's major general Gao Yaxian (高雅賢), who had persuaded Liu to rise against Tang in the first place. Subsequently, when Liu attacked Li Shiji, Li Shimin tried to come to Li Shiji's aid but was surrounded and nearly captured, being saved only by the heroics of Yuchi Gong. Li Shimin subsequently defeated Liu by flooding Liu's troops with water from the Ming River (flowing through Ming Prefecture), and Liu fled to Eastern Tujue. (Liu would return later that year and again take over former Xia territory, before being decisively defeated by Li Shimin's older brother Li Jiancheng the Crown Prince.) Li Shiji subsequently followed Li Shimin in attacking Liu's ally Xu Yuanlang the Prince of Lu, who controlled the modern central and western Shandong), and after Li Shimin was recalled to Chang'an, he continued the campaign against Xu Yuanlang with Li Shentong and Ren Gui (任瓌). By spring 623, Xu was desperate and abandoned his capital Yan Prefecture, in modern Jining, Shandong), and he was killed in flight. Li Shiji took his head and sent it to Emperor Gaozu.

Later in 623, the general Fu Gongshi rebelled against Tang at Danyang (丹楊, in modern Nanjing, Jiangsu) and declared himself the Emperor of Song. Li Shiji participated in the campaign against Fu, commanded by Emperor Gaozu's distant nephew Li Xiaogong the Prince of Zhao Commandery. After Tang forces converged on Danyang and defeated Song forces at Mount Bowang (博望山, in modern Ma'anshan, Anhui), Fu fled, and Li Shiji chased him down and, after he was captured by the gentlemen in the country, delivered him to Danyang, where Li Xiaogong executed him.

By 626, Li Jiancheng and Li Shimin were locked in an intense rivalry, and Li Shimin, fearing that Li Jiancheng might be intending to kill him, solicited advice from Li Shiji and another major general, Li Jing, and both refused to speak on the matter, drawing respect from Li Shimin for their unwillingness to be involved in an internecine struggle. (Note: This account, generally now accepted, was adopted by the Zizhi Tongjian. See Zizhi Tongjian, vol. 191. However, the Old Book of Tang gave a different account: that Li Jing and Li Shiji both offered to assist Li Shimin in a coup attempt. See Old Book of Tang, vol. 64. In his Zizhi Tongjian Kaoyi, Sima Guang noted the discrepancy in the accounts recorded in Old Book of Tang and Xiao Shuo (《小说》) by Liu Su (刘𫗧). Sima himself admitted that he could not determine which was the accurate account. However, the account found in Xiao Shuo had a more positive tone, which could be used to educate others. Hence, he included said account in Zizhi Tongjian.) In summer 626, Li Shimin ambushed Li Jiancheng and another brother, Li Yuanji the Prince of Qi, who supported Li Jiancheng, at Xuanwu Gate and killed them. He then effectively forced Emperor Gaozu to first create him crown prince and then yield the throne to him (as Emperor Taizong).

== During Emperor Taizong's reign ==
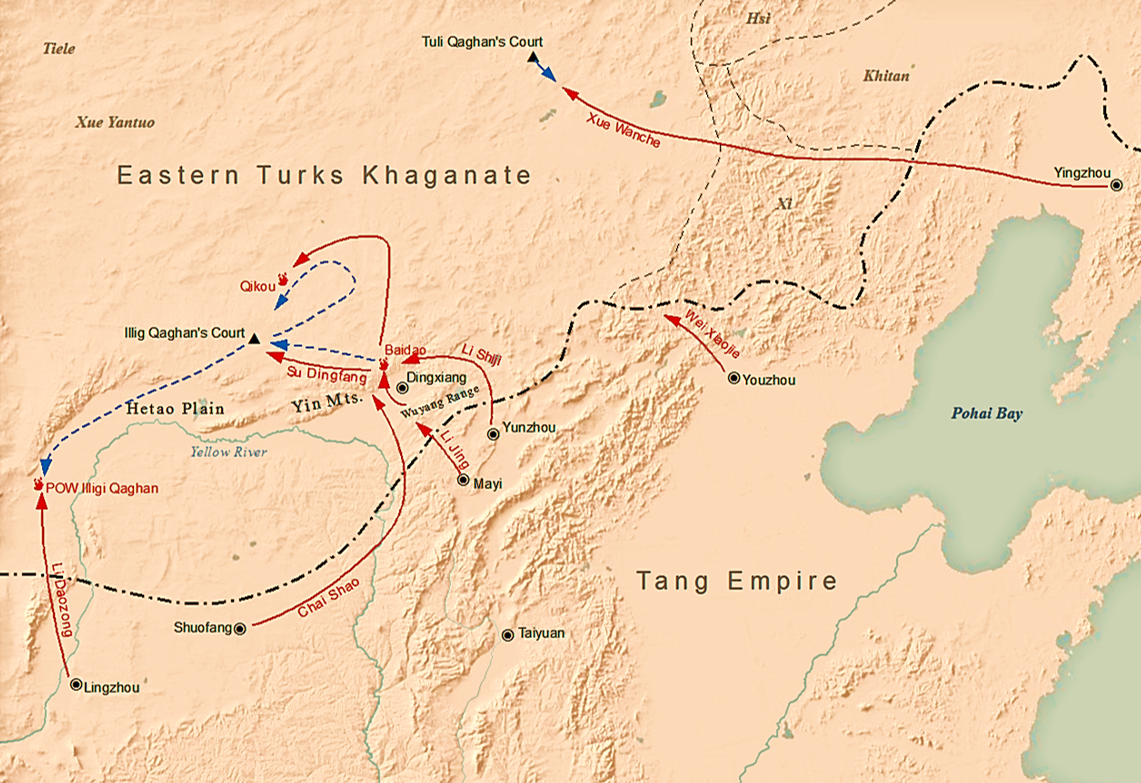
The campaign against Tujue in 630

After Emperor Taizong took the throne, he made Li Shiji the commandant at Bing Prefecture (并州, roughly modern Taiyuan, Shanxi). In 629, when Emperor Taizong launched a major attack against Eastern Tujue's Jiali Khan Ashina Duobi (a.k.a. Jieli Khan or Illig Qaghan), commanded by Li Jing, Li Shiji was one of the major generals under Li Jing's command and was in charge of one of the four prongs of attack. In spring 630, after Li Shiji defeated Eastern Tujue forces at Baidao (白道, in modern Hohhot, Inner Mongolia) and after Li Jing defeated Ashina Duobi's main forces and forced Ashina Duobi to flee, he met with Li Jing and decided to, despite the fact that Ashina Duobi claimed to then seek peace, attack Ashina Duobi, defeating him again and capturing most of Ashina Duobi's remaining forces. (Ashina Duobi himself fled further and was later captured by forces under the command of Emperor Taizong's cousin Li Daozong the Prince of Rencheng County.)

Meanwhile, as Emperor Taizong's son Li Zhi the Prince of Jin was made the nominal commandant of Bing Prefecture (but did not actually report to Bing), Li Shiji's title became the secretary general of Bing, but he continued to effectively serve as commandant. In 637, as part of Emperor Taizong's scheme to bestow prefectures on his relatives and great generals and officials as their permanent domains, Li Shiji's title was changed to Duke of Ying, and he was given the post of prefect of Qi Prefecture (蘄州, roughly modern Huanggang, Hubei), to be inherited by his heirs, but Li Shiji remained at Bing and did not actually report to Qi. Soon, however, with many objections to the system, the strongest of which came from Zhangsun Wuji, Emperor Taizong cancelled the scheme, although Li Shiji's title remained Duke of Ying. In 641, when discussing about Li Shiji, whom historical accounts indicated that the people obeyed without complaints, Emperor Taizong made the comment:

Emperor Yang of Sui labored the people to build the Great Wall to defend against Tujue attacks, but did no good. All I had to do was to put Li Shiji at Jinyang [(i.e., Bing Prefecture)], and there would not even be dust flying in the air. Is he not a more impressive Great Wall?

in winter 641, Emperor Taizong promoted him to the post of minister of defense. Soon, however, even before Li Shiji could leave for Chang'an, Xueyantuo's Zhenzhu Khan Yi'nan, believing that Emperor Taizong was about to carry out a major sacrifice to the gods of Mount Tai and therefore would not have time for military action, launched a major attack against Tang's vassal, the Qilibi Khan Ashina Simo, whom Emperor Taizong had created the khan of a reestablished Eastern Tujue in 639. Ashina Simo could not resist, and withdrew within the Great Wall to Shuo Prefecture (roughly modern Shuozhou, Shanxi). Emperor Taizong launched armies, commanded by five generals, including Li Shiji, to aid Eastern Tujue. Around the new year 641, Li Shiji engaged Xueyantuo forces, under the command of Yi'nan's son Dadu (大度), at Nuozhen River (諾真水, flowing through modern Baotou, Inner Mongolia), defeating Xueyantuo forces and forcing them to flee. (Based on comments that Li Shiji made in 644 while advocating a campaign against Goguryeo, it appeared that Li Shiji wanted to advance further to try to destroy Xueyantuo, but Emperor Taizong, at the urging of Wei Zheng, ordered him to stop.) Li Shiji subsequently returned to Chang'an to serve as minister of defense.

In 643, when Emperor Taizong commissioned the Portraits at Lingyan Pavilion to commemorate the 24 great contributors to Tang rule, Li Shiji's was one of the portraits commissioned. In spring of that year, when Emperor Taizong's son Li You (李祐) the Prince of Qi, angry at his secretary general Quan Wanji (權萬紀), killed Quan and then declared a rebellion, Emperor Taizong sent Li Shiji to attack Li You, although even before Li Shiji's forces arrived, Li You's subordinates captured him. Subsequently, in summer 643, when Li Chengqian the Crown Prince, was revealed to have plotted to overthrow Emperor Taizong, as he was fearful that Emperor Taizong would replace him with his brother Li Tai the Prince of Wei, Emperor Taizong had Li Shiji, along with other key officials Zhangsun Wuji, Fang Xuanling, Xiao Yu, as well as officials in charge of the supreme court, the legislative bureau, and the examination bureau, investigate. They confirmed Li Chengqian's guilt. Emperor Taizong thus deposed Li Chengqian and, believing that Li Tai's machinations were responsible for Li Chengqian's downfall, also demoted Li Tai and exiled them both, creating Li Zhi crown prince instead. Li Shiji was given the additional title as the new crown prince's head of household, and was also given a newly created title of Tong Zhongshu Menxia Sanpin (同中書門下三品), which title designated him as a chancellor de facto.

Historical accounts indicated that at one point, when Li Shiji was suddenly ill, medical books indicated that ashes from beards could benefit him, and therefore Emperor Taizong cut off his own beard and burned it to mix it with the medicine. After Li Shiji grew better, he bowed to thank Emperor Taizong—so greatly that he bled from his forehead by pounding on the floor—and Emperor Taizong responded, "I did so for the empire, not for you. You do not need to thank me." Further, on one occasion, when Li Shiji was attending an imperial feast, Emperor Taizong stated: "I am selecting, among the great achievers, one that I can entrust an orphan [(i.e., the Crown Prince)] to, and no one is more suitable than you are. You did not turn your back on Li Mi, and I know that you will not turn your back on me." Li Shiji was so thankful that he wept and bit his finger so hard that he bled. Also at that feast, when Li Shiji became drunk and fell asleep, Emperor Taizong took off his own imperial robe to cover Li Shiji.

In spring 644, when the Tang emissary to Goguryeo, Xiangli Xuanjiang (相里玄獎), returned from Goguryeo, indicating that the Yŏn Kaesomun, the Goguryeo general who then controlled the political scene there, was unwilling to stop his attacks against Silla, then a Tang vassal, Li Shiji advocated an attack against Goguryeo, and Emperor Taizong agreed, despite opposition by other officials, including Chu Suiliang. Emperor Taizong, after several months of preparations, launched a two-pronged attack against Goguryeo in winter 644, with Li Shiji in charge of the land army containing 60,000 soldiers, heading toward Liaodong Peninsula, and with Zhang Liang in charge of the navy numbering 40,000 soldiers, heading directly toward the Goguryeo capital Pyongyang. Emperor Taizong himself trailed them.

In spring 645, Li Shiji reached You Prefecture (幽州, roughly modern Beijing), and then headed into Goguryeo territory. Together with Li Daozong, he captured Gaemo (蓋牟, in modern Fushun, Liaoning), and then put the important city of Liaodong/Yodong (遼東, in modern Liaoyang, Liaoning) under siege. After Emperor Taizong himself arrived, Liaodong fell. Tang forces then continued heading southeast, toward Yalu River, putting Ansi (安市, in modern Anshan, Liaoning) under siege. When a major Goguryeo army, commanded by the generals Go Yeonsu (高延壽) and Go Hyezin (高惠真) arrived, Emperor Taizong had Li Shiji command 15,000 men to serve as decoy, and when Goguryeo forces attacked Li Shiji, Zhangsun Wuji attacked them from behind with 11,000 men, and Li Shiji and Zhangsun, as well as Emperor Taizong himself, defeated Goguryeo forces, forcing their surrender. He then considered directly attacking Pyongyang itself, but Li Shiji believed that if Ansi was not captured first, the general in command of Ansi (a capable general known in Korean popular legends as Yang Manch'un, although whether that was his real name is unknown), might attack Tang forces from the rear. Emperor Taizong agreed, and therefore put Ansi under siege again.

However, the commander at Ansi was a capable defender, and the resolve of the defenders was strengthened when Li Shiji, in anger, declared that after the fall of the city all residents would be slaughtered. In fall 645, unable to capture Ansi, with food supplies running low, Emperor Taizong ordered a withdrawal, with Li Shiji and Li Daozong serving as rear guard.

In 646, with Xueyantuo in internal turmoil due to the cruelty of the Duomi Khan Bazhuo (Yi'nan's son), Emperor Taizong sent Li Daozong to launch a major attack on Xueyantuo, defeating Xueyantuo forces. Bazhuo fled, but was then attacked and killed by Huige, which took over Xueyantuo territory. Xueyantuo's remaining forces supported Yi'nan's nephew Duomozhi as Yitewushi Khan. Duomozhi offered to submit, but Emperor Taizong, fearful that Xueyantuo might recover and create more trouble later on, sent Li Shiji with an army toward Duomozhi's location. Duomozhi surrendered, and Li attacked the remaining forces unwilling to submit, defeating and capturing them. He delivered Duomozhi to Chang'an, where Emperor Taizong made Duomozhi a general.

In 647, Emperor Taizong began yearly raids against Goguryeo, intended to weaken Goguryeo's border regions, in preparation for another future major offensive. For the 647 raids, Li Shiji was in charge of the land prong, while Niu Jinda (牛進達) was in charge of the sea prong.

In summer 649, Emperor Taizong was gravely ill (probably from consuming pills given him by alchemists), and he, not fully trusting Li Shiji, stated to Li Zhi: (Note: In Li Shiji's biographies in both Books of Tang, there was no mention of Taizong imploring Gaozong to execute Li.)

Li Shiji is full of ability and wisdom, but you had done him no favors, and it may be difficult for him to be faithful to you. I am going to exile him now. If he leaves immediately, promote him to be Puye [(僕射, head of the important executive bureau of the government)] and trust him after I die. If he hesitates, execute him.

He then demoted Li Shiji to the post of the commandant of Die Prefecture (疊州, roughly modern Gannan Tibetan Autonomous Prefecture, Gansu). Li Shiji, after receiving the order, departed without hesitation. The modern historian Bo Yang, commenting on this incident, opined that this showed that, down inside, neither Li Shiji nor Emperor Taizong actually trusted each other, as Li Shiji was too capable for Emperor Taizong's liking. (Note: When annotating the Zizhi Tongjian, Hu Sanxing also expressed similar opinions.) Another explanation is that the Taizong was playing an age-old trick to test Li Shiji's loyalty. While he's alive, he was able to handle Li Shiji; he was afraid that his son would not be able to do so after his death. He intentionally demoted Li Shiji to test his response. If Li Shiji showed any hesitation or unhappiness, he would have been executed and the new emperor would not have to deal with him. If Li Shiji didn't show any emotion about the demotion, the new emperor can promote him to show he liked him so Li Shiji would be loyal to him. This turned out to be a bad move. Years later, when Gaozong tried to make Wu Zetian (武則天) his empress against the opposition of most high officials, Li Shiji decisively put the issue in Wu Zetian's favor by saying that's Gaozong's "family affair". Nine days later, Emperor Taizong died and was succeeded by Li Zhi (as Emperor Gaozong).

== During Emperor Gaozong's reign ==
Almost immediately after taking the throne, Emperor Gaozong promoted Li Shiji to be the general in charge of Luoyang. (Note: As Emperor Gaozong also, at the same time, declared naming taboo was to be observed as to the characters shi and min (Emperor Taizong, as his name had two common characters, previously only ordered that naming taboo was to be observed against the use of shimin consecutively), thereafter, Li Shiji became known as Li Ji.) Almost as immediately, Emperor Gaozong repromoted him back to the post of chancellor de facto. He then further made him Puye (Executive State Secretary).

In winter 650, Li Ji requested to be relieved of the post of Puye. Emperor Gaozong agreed, but had him remain as chancellor de facto.

In 653, Emperor Gaozong bestowed the highly honorific title of Sikong (司空, Minister of Works) on Li Ji, who continued to be chancellor de facto.

In 655, with Emperor Gaozong having lost favor in his wife Empress Wang and greatly favoring his concubine Consort Wu, he wanted to depose Empress Wang and create Consort Wu empress. Almost all high level officials opposed—on the account that Consort Wu had previously been a concubine of Emperor Taizong and therefore having her as a wife would be considered incest, and on the account that Empress Wang was from an honored clan while Consort Wu, while herself from a noble family, was not as highly born—with the conspicuous exceptions of Li Ji, Zhangsun Wuji, and Yu Zhining, each of whom was silent, although Zhangsun and Yu showed their disapproval. The opposition from Chu Shuiliang was particularly fervent. However, when Emperor Gaozong summoned Li Ji to ask his opinion, Li Ji responded, "This is your family matter, Your Imperial Majesty. Why ask anyone else?" Emperor Gaozong therefore deposed Empress Wang and her ally Consort Xiao to commoner rank and created Consort Wu empress instead, having Li Ji serve as the ceremonial emissary. (Note: Later, at Empress Wu's request, Emperor Gaozong further executed the former Empress Wang and Consort Xiao.) Empress Wu soon became dominant at court, installing officials who favored her ascension in chancellor posts and carrying out a near complete purge of the officials who opposed her or showed disapproval, even including Zhangsun (who, as Emperor Gaozong's uncle, was a major advocate for his having been made crown prince), but Li Ji, not having opposed her, escaped such actions. (Note: Li Ji was nominally put in charge of the investigation during false accusations against Zhangsun for treason (brought by Empress Wu's associate Xu Jingzong), but it does not appear that he was actually responsible for Zhangsun's demise.) In 663, Li Ji was in charge of the corruption probe against another associate of Empress Wu's, the chancellor Li Yifu, leading to Li Yifu's removal, although, again, Li Ji's own involvement was not clear.

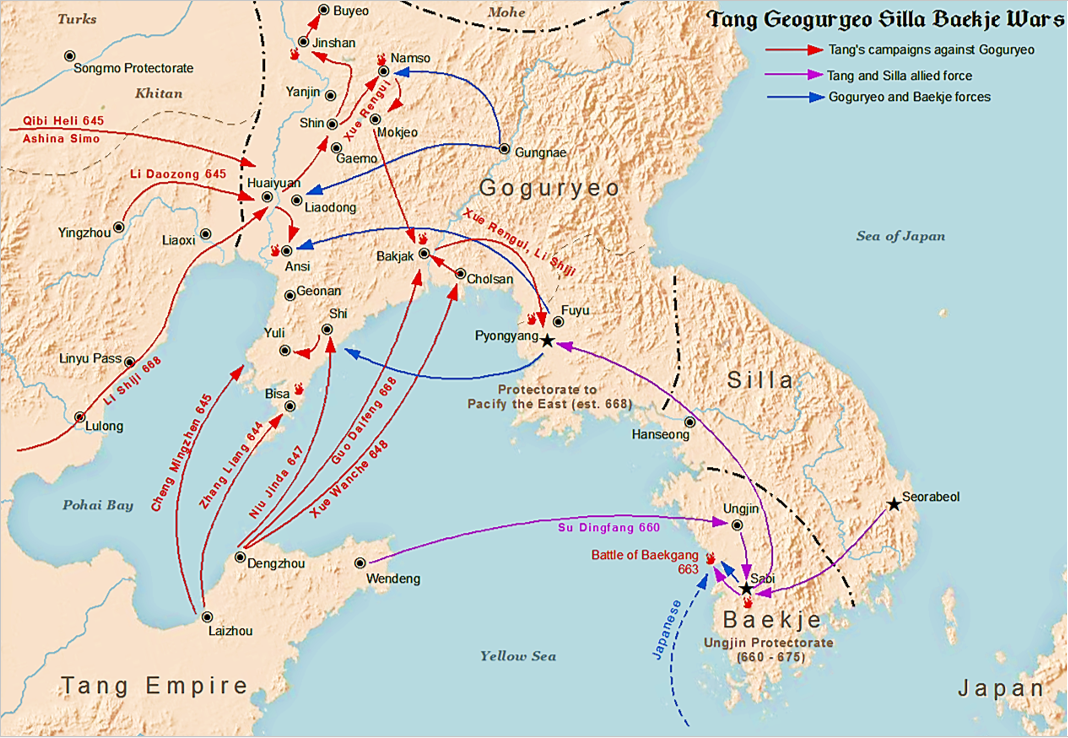
Tang-Goguryeo war.

Around new year 667, after Yŏn Kaesomun's death and infighting between Yeon's sons Yŏn Namsaeng and Yŏn Namgŏn, leading to Yŏn Namsaeng's fleeing to Tang, Emperor Gaozong launched an army, commanded by Li Ji, with Yŏn Namsaeng (by this point renamed Cheon Hŏnsŏng/Quan Nansheng, as Yŏn (淵) was the same character as Emperor Gaozu's name and therefore unusable per naming taboo) serving as his guide. In fall 667, Li Ji first captured Sinseong (新城, in modern Fushun, Liaoning), and then advanced further. Meanwhile, the generals serving under him, Pang Tongshan (龐同善), Gao Kan (高侃), and Xue Rengui, also defeated Yŏn Namgŏn's forces. However, the fleet commanded by Guo Daifeng (郭待封, Guo Xiaoke's son) ran into problems with food supplies, and wanted to seek aid from Li Ji, but was fearful that if his request fell into Goguryeo hands that his weakness would be revealed, so he wrote the request in code, written as a poem, and sent it to Li Ji. Li Ji, initially not understanding that it was code, was angry that Guo was writing poems on the frontline, but his secretary Yuan Wanqing (元萬頃) was able to decode the poem, showing Li Ji the request, so Li Ji sent food supplies to Guo. (Yuan was later, however, exiled when he wrote a declaration against Goguryeo that stated, "You do not even know to defend Yalu River!" after which Yŏn Namgŏn responded by stating, "I accept your suggestion!" and defended Yalu River, not allowing Li Ji to cross.) Only in fall 668 was Li Ji able to cross Yalu River and advance to Pyongyang and put the city under siege. The King Bojang, Yŏn Namgŏn's younger brother Yŏn Namsan, and a number of officials surrendered, but Yŏn Namgŏn continued fighting. A few days later, though, his general, the Buddhist monk Sinsŏng (信誠), opened the city gates and surrendered. Yŏn Namgŏn tried to commit suicide, but was captured and saved by Tang forces. This was the end of Goguryeo. Later that year, after Li Ji returned to Chang'an, a great procession was held in his honor, and around the new year 669, when Emperor Gaozong offered sacrifices to Heaven, he had Li Ji sacrifice after he did—an extraordinary honor.

Later in 669, Li Ji grew ill. Emperor Gaozong summoned all of Li Ji's brothers and sons who were serving outside the capital back to Chang'an to attend to him. Li Ji took only medications given him by Emperor Gaozong and Li Hong the Crown Prince, but otherwise refused medical treatment, stating:

I was only a farmer east of the [Yao] Mountains. I happened to encounter holy emperors, and I was able to become one of the Three Excellencies. I am also almost 80. Is it not the protection of Heaven? How long a life will be is already preordained. How can I beg for a longer life from doctors?

One day, Li Ji summoned his younger brother Li Bi (李弼) and told Li Bi that he was feeling better that day, and should summon all of his relatives to hold a feast. At the end of the feast, he stated to Li Bi:

I know that my illness will not be cured. This feast is a farewell to you all. Do not cry, but listen to me. I saw with my own eyes how Fang Xuanling and Du Ruhui worked hard all their lives and established their fame, but they encountered wicked descendants who overturned their clans, without further hope. All of my sons and grandsons are here, and I entrust them to you. After I die and am buried, move to my bedroom and care for the young ones. Look over them carefully. If any of them think in dangerous ways or associate with people without virtues, batter them to death, and then report to the Emperor.

He spoke no further, and not long after, around the new year 670, he died. He was buried with extraordinary honors near Tang Zhaoling, the tomb of Emperor Taizong; by Emperor Gaozong's orders, his tomb was made into the shape of several great mountains within Eastern Tujue and Xueyantuo territory, to commemorate his victories over them. The tomb now shares a site with Zhaoling Museum.

The Song dynasty historian Sima Guang, in his Zizhi Tongjian, stated:

Li Ji, as a military commander, was full of strategies and capable of making excellent decisions. When he discussed issues with others, he accepted good suggestions as fast as the flowing water. When he achieved a victory, he credited his subordinates. The awards of gold, silver, and silk he received were all distributed to his officers and soldiers. People were willing to sacrifice for him, so whenever he launched an attack, he was always successful. He always selected, as his officers, those with proper appearances and who were tolerant and serious. When asked why, his response was, "Those who are of ill fortune will not be successful." His reign over his household was strict but loving. Once, when he was Puye, his elder sister was ill, and he personally cooked porridge for her. Suddenly, a gust of wind blew the flame, which burned his beard. His sister said, "You have many male and female servants. Why do you have to labor yourself?" He responded, "It is not that I have no one to order. It is only that you are old, and I am old. Would there really be enough times for me to be able to cook porridge for you?

Li Ji's oldest son Li Zhen (李震) predeceased him, so the title of Duke of Ying was inherited by Li Zhen's son Li Jingye. In 684, after Emperor Gaozong's death and after Empress Dowager Wu deposed her third son with Emperor Gaozong, Emperor Zhongzong, replacing him with her fourth son Emperor Ruizong but was posturing toward taking the throne herself, Li Jingye rose in rebellion. In reprisal, Empress Dowager Wu destroyed Li Ji's tomb, posthumously stripped him of his titles, and slaughtered most, but not all, of his descendants. In 705, after Emperor Zhongzong was restored following a coup against his mother (who was then ruling as "Emperor" of her state of Zhou), Li Ji's tomb and titles were restored.

== Popular culture ==
Li Shiji is sometimes venerated as a door god in Chinese and Taoist temples, usually in partnership with Wei Zheng.

Li Ji is one of the 32 historical figures who appear as special characters in the video game Romance of the Three Kingdoms XI by Koei.
