= Li Daozong =

7th-century Chinese Tang dynasty prince

Li Daozong (Chinese: 李道宗) (603? - 656?), courtesy name Chengfan (承範), was an imperial prince of the Tang dynasty of China. He was a cousin of the Emperor Taizong, and during the Emperor Taizong's reign commanded forces in campaigns against the Eastern Tujue, Tuyuhun, Goguryeo, and Xueyantuo. In 653, during the reign of Emperor Taizong's son Emperor Gaozong, Li Daozong offended Emperor Gaozong's uncle, the powerful chancellor Zhangsun Wuji, and Zhangsun exiled him to Xiang Prefecture (roughly modern Laibin, Guangxi), on accusation that he associated with the treasonous Fang Yi'ai (房遺愛). Li Daozong died on the way to exile.

== During Emperor Gaozu's reign ==
Li Daozong was probably born in 603, during the reign of Emperor Wen of Sui (Yang Jian). His grandfather Li Zhang (李璋) was a Northern Zhou official and a son of the Western Wei general Li Hu (李虎), the grandfather of the major Sui dynasty general Li Yuan, who had been executed late in Northern Zhou for plotting with the Northern Zhou prince Yuwen Zhao (宇文招) to kill Yang Jian while Yang Jian was regent and on the path to take over the throne. Li Zhang's sons were not killed, however, and one of them, Li Shao (李韶), was Li Daozong's father.

Li Yuan rebelled against Emperor Yang of Sui in 617, and by 618 had established Tang dynasty as its Emperor Gaozu. He created many of his relatives with nobility titles, Li Daozong was created the Duke of Lüeyang. In 619, a major Tang enemy Liu Wuzhou the Dingyang Khan attacked and captured most of Tang's holdings in modern Shanxi and approached Hedong (河東, in modern Yuncheng, Shanxi). Li Daozong served under Emperor Gaozu's son Li Shimin the Prince of Qin in resisting Liu, and at his suggestion, Li Shimin did not engage Liu immediately, choosing to wear out Liu's food supplies, eventually allowing Li Shimin to defeat Liu. Further, during the campaign, Li Daozong and Yuwen Shiji were able to persuade Liu's general Yuchi Gong to surrender, and Yuchi later became an important general under Li Shimin.

Li Daozong was then made the commandant at Ling Prefecture (靈州, roughly modern Yinchuan, Ningxia). When Liang Luoren (梁洛仁), the brother of Liang Shidu the Emperor of Liang attacked with assistance from Eastern Tujue, and Li Daozong was able to repel him, and further expel the Eastern Tujue general Ashina Yushe (阿史那郁射) from the Wuyuan (五原, in modern Yulin, Shaanxi). Emperor Gaozong, comparing Li Daozong's accomplishments to those of the Cao Wei imperial prince Cao Zhang the Prince of Rencheng, created Li Daozong the Prince of Rencheng.

== During Emperor Taizong's reign ==
In 626, Li Shimin, then in an intense rivalry with his older brother Li Jiancheng the Crown Prince and fearful that Li Jiancheng was about to kill him, ambushed Li Jiancheng and another brother, Li Yuanji the Prince of Qi, who supported Li Jiancheng, at Xuanwu Gate and killed them. He then effectively forced Emperor Gaozu to create him crown prince and then yield the throne to him (as Emperor Taizong). He recalled Li Daozong from Ling Prefecture, first to serve as the director of vassal affairs, and then as the chief judge of the supreme court. Later on, when Emperor Taizong was planning to attack Eastern Tujue, he again made Li Daozong the commandant at Ling Prefecture. In 630, when the general Li Jing launched the attack on Eastern Tujue, Li Daozong served under him, and eventually participated in the capture of Eastern Tujue's Jiali Khan Ashina Duobi, with Li Daozong's assistant Zhang Baoxiang (張寶相) carrying out the actual capture. Upon return, Emperor Taizong increased Li Daozong's fief by 600 households and made him the minister of justice.

In 634, Li Daozong again served under Li Jing, this time in an operation against Tuyuhun's Busabo Khan Murong Fuyun. Tang forces achieved initial victories, but Tuyuhun forces then burned the grazing grass to cut the food supplies to Tang horses. Most Tang generals wanted to withdraw, but Li Daozong advocated continued advance, and Li Jing agreed, eventually allowing complete victory, as Murong Fuyun was killed by his subordinates, allowing his son Murong Shun, whom Tang supported, to become khan.

In 637, as part of Emperor Taizong's scheme to bestow prefectures on his relatives and great generals and officials as their permanent domains, Li Daozong's title was changed to Prince of Jiangxia, and he was given the post of prefect of E Prefecture (roughly modern Ezhou, Hubei), to be inherited by his heirs. Soon, however, with many objections to the system, the strongest of which came from Zhangsun Wuji, Emperor Taizong cancelled the scheme, although Li Daozong's title remained Prince of Jiangxia and he remained the Prefect of E Prefecture. At one point, he was accused of corruption, and Emperor Taizong, in anger, removed him from the post and reduced his fief, but permitted him to return to his mansion as a prince. Eventually, he was made the minister of ceremonies. After Hou Junji destroyed Gaochang in 640, allowing Tang to annex Gaochang, Hou was unhappy that Emperor Taizong did not reward him as much as he expected and had further investigated him for stealing from the Gaochang treasury. Li Daozong, knowing that Hou was unhappy, warned Emperor Taizong that Hou may commit treason—a warning that Emperor Taizong did not believe, but later, in 643, after Hou was implicated in a plot with the crown prince Li Chengqian and executed, reminded Li Daozong about and thanked him for.

In 641, Li Daozong sent his daughter, who was adopted by Emperor Taizong and titled Princess Wencheng, to Tibet to be married to the Tibetan king Songtsen Gampo, as a part of the treaty of peace between Tang dynasty and Tibetan Empire. Li Daozong met Tibetan escorts at Xingxiuhai (near the Gyaring Lake and the source of Yellow River) and then returned to Chang'an.

In 645, Li Daozong accompanied Emperor Taizong in attacking Goguryeo, and he served as assistant to the forward commander Li Shiji. In summer 645, they captured Gaemo (蓋牟, in modern Fushun, Liaoning), and then defeated Goguryeo forces at Yodong/Liaodong (遼東, in modern Liaoyang, Liaoning), allowing Emperor Taizong to then capture Liaodong. However, after another victory over Goguryeo forces at Ansi (安市, in modern Anshan, Liaoning), Emperor Taizong became bogged down in his siege of Ansi, and Li Daozong suggested, instead, that he skip Ansi and directly attack the Goguryeo capital Pyongyang. Emperor Taizong initially agreed, but Li Shiji and Zhangsun Wuji opposed, believing that if they did not capture Ansi first, Ansi's defender (a capable general known in Korean popular legends as Yang Manch'un, although whether that was his real name is unknown) would attack them from the rear. Emperor Taizong therefore continued to siege Ansi. During Ansi's siege, part of Ansi's city walls collapsed, and Tang forces had an opportunity to enter, but at that time, Fu Fu'ai (傅伏愛), an officer under Li Daozong, was not paying attention, and instead Goguryeo forces fought out from the breach and captured the part of the offensive earthworks that Li Daozong was responsible for, using it instead for defense. For this offense, Emperor Taizong executed Fu, and when Li Daozong, baring his feet to show remorse, requested forgiveness, Emperor Taizong rebuked him but kept him in command of his forces. Subsequently, with Ansi's defenses holding, Emperor Taizong withdrew, with Li Shiji and Li Daozong serving as the rear guard. After returning to Chang'an, Li Daozong offered to resign on account of illness, and Emperor Taizong made him the director of imperial clan affairs, a much less stressful position.

== During Emperor Gaozong's reign ==
In 649, Emperor Taizong died and was succeeded by his second crown prince, Li Zhi (as Emperor Gaozong). Emperor Gaozong's uncle Zhangsun Wuji and Chu Suiliang served as the lead chancellors. In 652, a plot was discovered, centered around Empress Taizong's daughter Princess Gaoyang and her husband Fang Yi'ai that, allegedly, sought to install Emperor Taizong's brother Li Yuanjing (李元景) the Prince of Jing as emperor. Zhangsun expanded the scope of the investigations and, in spring 653, the co-conspirators were killed. However, as Zhangsun and Chu both had rivalries with Li Daozong, they exiled Li Daozong, as well as the chancellor Yuwen Jie and the general Zhishi Sili (執失思力), to Xiang Prefecture. Li Daozong died on the way to his place of exile, at the age of 53, probably in 656. Later, after Zhangsun's and Chu's own downfalls (at the hands of Emperor Gaozong's wife Empress Wu and her associates), Li Daozong's posts were posthumously restored.

It was said that late in his life, Li Daozong was studious and humble. The New Book of Tang praised Li Daozong and his cousin Li Xiaogong to be the most capable princes early in Tang history.

== See also ==
- Goguryeo–Tang War
