= Yin Mountains =

Mountain range in northern China

Coordinates: 41°N 112°E

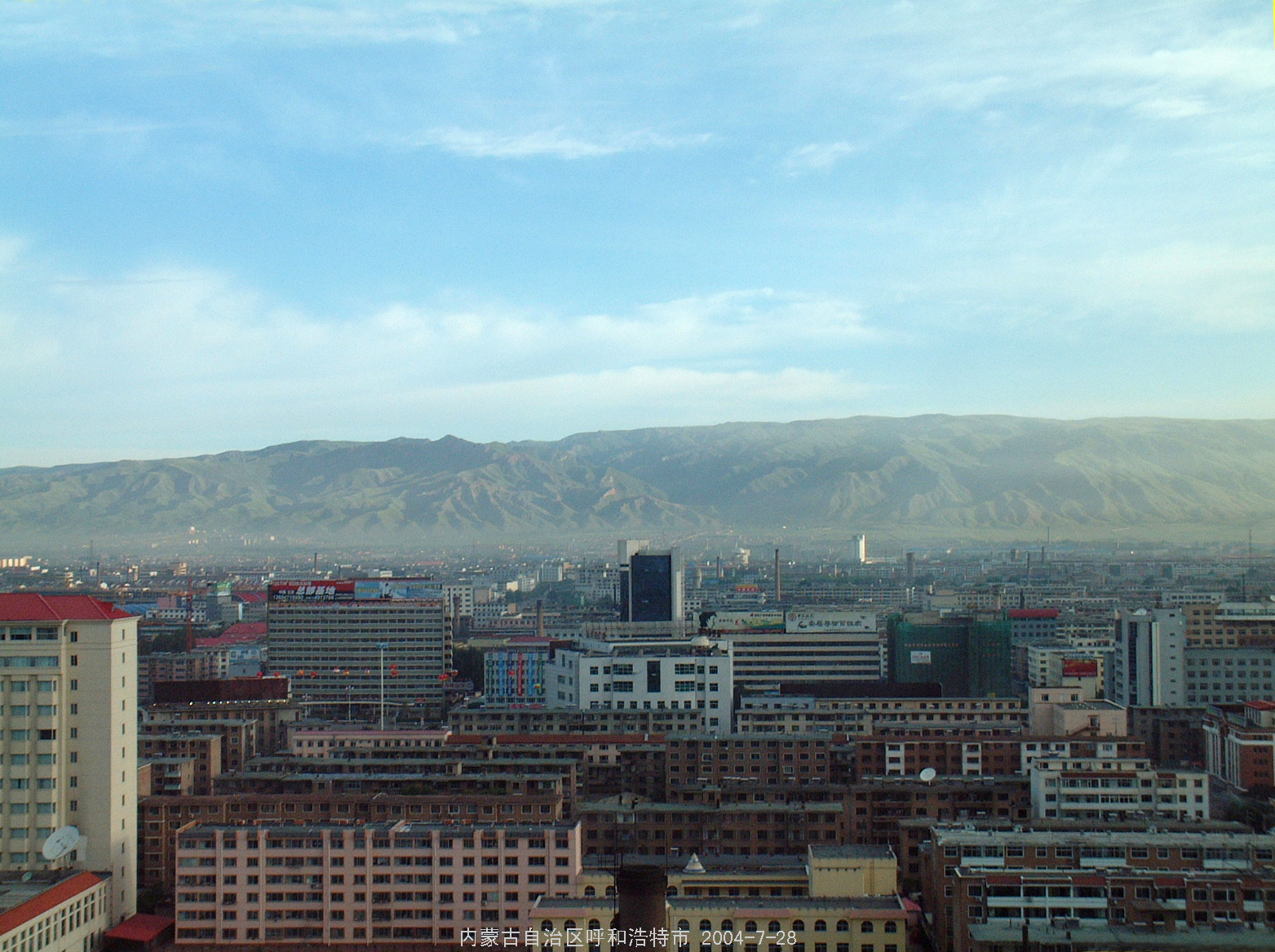
- Daqing Shan seen from Hohhot to its south
- Traditional Chinese: 陰山
- Simplified Chinese: 阴山
- Literal meaning: Yin Mountain(s)
Transcriptions
Standard Mandarin
- Hanyu Pinyin: Yīnshān; Yīnshān
- Wade–Giles: Yin-shan; Yin Shan

Daqing Mountains
- Chinese: 大青山
- Literal meaning: Great Blue or Green Mountain(s)
Transcriptions
Standard Mandarin
- Hanyu Pinyin: Daqingshan

The Yin Mountains, also known as the Daqing Mountains, (Note: Variably called Yin Shan, Yinshan, Daqing Shan) are a mountain range in the Eastern Gobi Desert steppe of the Inner Mongolian Autonomous Region of China. The Yellow River borders the mountains to the south.

== Geology ==
The mountains are mainly composed of very old metamorphic rock.
