= Ashina Shibobi =

Tolis Qaghan

Lesser Qaghan of the Eastern Turkic Khaganate
- Reign: 620–630
- Predecessor: Illig Qaghan
- Successor: Ashina Heluohu (阿史那賀邏鶻)
- Born: c. 603
- Died: 631 (aged c. 28); Bingzhou, Tang dynasty
- Spouse: Princess Huainan (淮南公主)
- Issue: Ashina Heluohu (阿史那賀邏鶻)
Names
- Ashina Shibobi (阿史那什鉢苾)
Regnal name
- Tolis Qaghan (突利可汗)
- House: Ashina
- Dynasty: Eastern Turkic Khaganate
- Father: Shibi Qaghan
- Religion: Tengrism

Ashina Shibobi (Chinese: 阿史那什鉢苾; c. 603 – 631), regnal name Tolis Qaghan (Chinese: 突利可汗; Old Turkic: 𐱅𐰇𐰠𐰾𐰴𐰍𐰣, Töles qaγan), was a lesser qaghan of the eastern wing of the Eastern Turkic Khaganate. After he submitted to the Tang dynasty, he was accorded the noble title of Commandery Prince of Beiping (北平郡王).

== Early life ==
Ashina Shibobi was born to Shibi Qaghan. Shibobi was made Nipu shad by Chuluo Qaghan and Tolis khagan by Illig Qaghan.

== Career ==
After the downfall of the Sui dynasty, Ashina Shibobi joined his uncle, Illig Qaghan's raids against the Tang dynasty. On 12 August 624, their armies clashed west of Binzhou. Emperor Taizong then went to Shibobi to seek a peace deal.

In 628, Kumo Xi tribes rose in rebellion against the Eastern Turkic Khaganate. Shibobi was unsuccessful in defeating the rebels, which angered the Khagan. After Yukuk Shad was defeated by Huige chief Yaoluge Pusa, Shibobi was ordered to pursue and defeat Yaoluge Pusa, but in late April, he was defeated. Illig ordered him to be flogged and imprisoned for 10 days. Taizong used this opportunity to encourage Shibobi to flee to the Tang.

On 21 April 628, Shibobi asked Taizong to help him fight Illig. In December of the following year, Shibobi fully submitted to the Tang and was given 700 families as a reward to serves as general for the dynasty. He died c. November 631, while on his way to Chang'an, near Binzhou.

== Family ==
Shibobi married Princess Huainan (淮南公主), daughter of Emperor Yang of Sui.
