= Monza ampullae =

Historical flasks used to hold holy oil

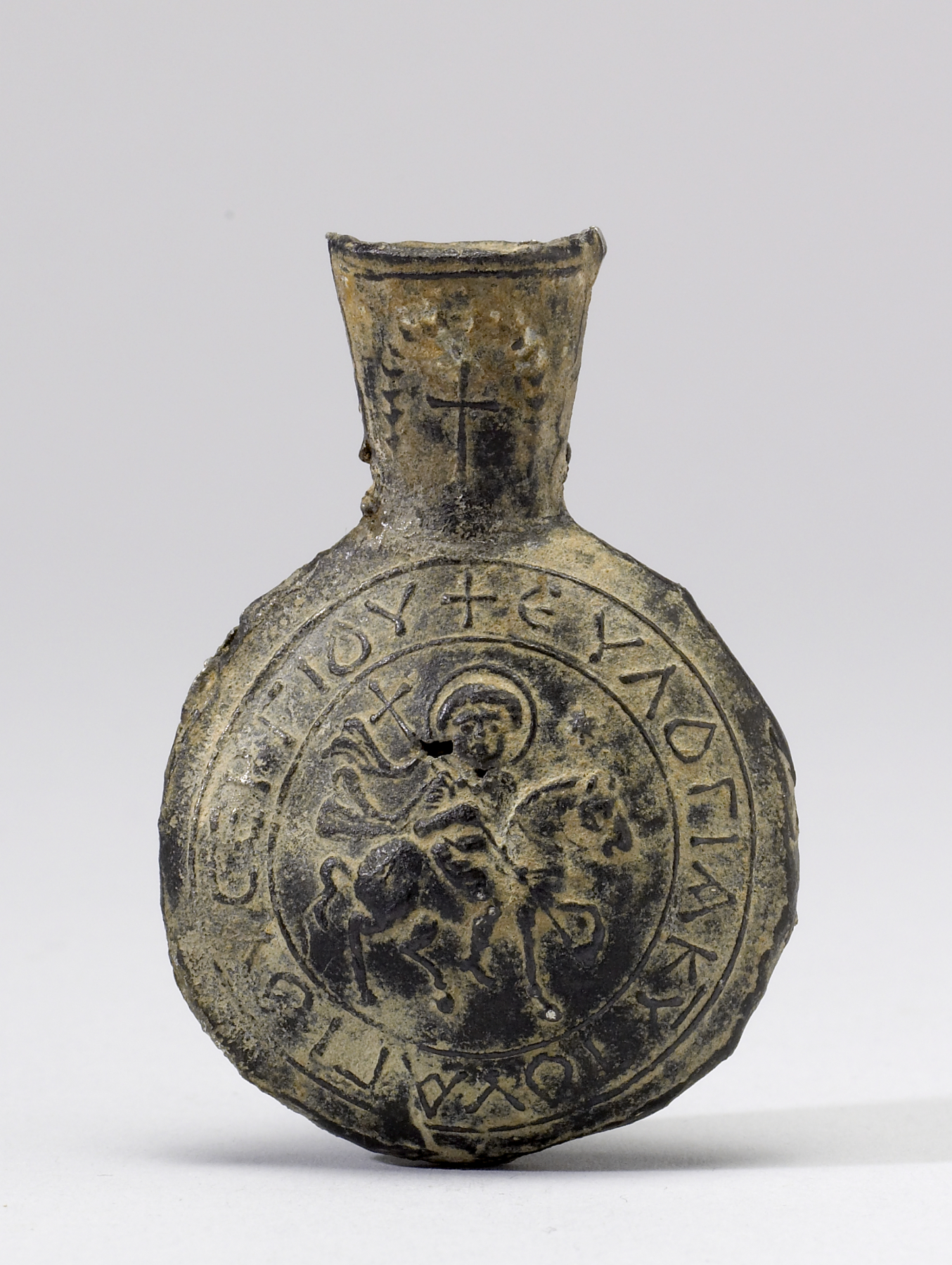
A similar style of 6th-century pilgrim ampulla, here from the shrine of Saint Sergios in Syria. 5.4 cm (2.1 in) high, 3.81 cm (1.5 in) wide, 1.59 cm (0.6 in) deep

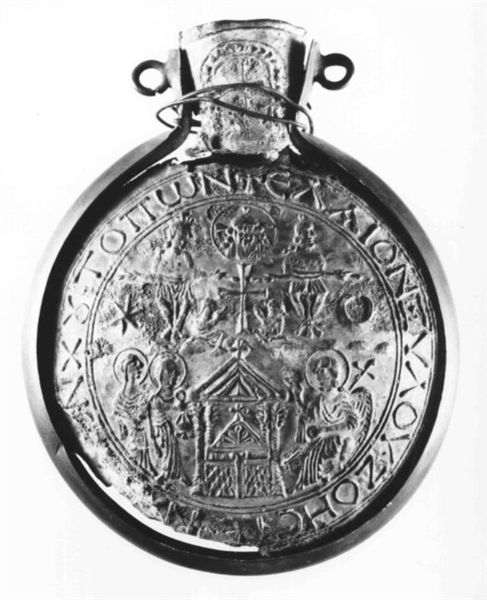
A flask from Bobbio, with the Women at the empty tomb

The Monza ampullae form the largest collection of a specific type of Early Medieval pilgrimage ampullae or small flasks designed to hold holy oil from pilgrimage sites in the Holy Land related to the life of Jesus. They were made in Palestine, probably in the fifth to early seventh centuries, and have been in the Treasury of Monza Cathedral north of Milan in Italy since they were donated by Theodelinda, queen of the Lombards (c. 570–628). Since the great majority of surviving examples of such flasks are those in the Monza group, the term may be used to cover this type of object in general.

The second largest group was discovered in a burial at Bobbio Abbey, not far from Monza, and names such as Monza/Bobbio flasks ampullae or flagons are among the many terms by which these objects are described. The few other examples are now scattered across the world; this article deals with the whole group of over fifty known ampullae, wherever located. Examples of comparable ampullae from pilgrimage sites outside the Holy Land have also survived, for example a very similar one from a Syrian site related to Saint Sergius, now in the Walters Art Museum, Baltimore.

The ampullae are cast in various metals, including silver (perhaps "silvered" would be more accurate), tin and lead, and are mainly of interest because of the images they carry, which come from a period which has left very few traces in art, and was of crucial importance in establishing the iconography of many Christian subjects. They are also believed to represent buildings and shrines found in Jerusalem in the sixth and early seventh centuries, giving important evidence as to the early appearance of these. They were brought back from the Holy Land filled with oil which had been used in lamps burning before important pilgrimage shrines. Despite their ending up in the heart of the institutional church under royal patronage, the ampullae were made as mass-produced souvenirs, probably relatively inexpensive, whose designs reflect the experiences and concerns of pilgrims as well as those of the church.

== General description ==
The ampullae are round when seen from the front, with a flattened body giving convex faces and a small neck, often with a fitting round the neck for a chain or cord by which they could be suspended, or perhaps worn. There are records of similar blessed objects, or eulogia, being hung on the bedpost for protection from demons at night, and the oil, or just the relic, was believed to be able to heal the sick when applied to them. Often there is a strip in a different metal running round the edge of the faces and up the sides of the neck, with little rings for a suspension cord. In the Monza examples these strips are secured by wire wound rather untidily round the neck. A diameter for the main body of about 5–7 cm is typical, and in a side view the body swells to a maximum thickness of about 3 cm. Those at Monza are in generally good condition, but those from Bobbio and other examples such as the one at Dumbarton Oaks are flattened and damaged; they are now mostly black in colour.

Despite their small size, the images are typically crowded multi-figure compositions, sometimes with extensive depiction of architectural elements, and somewhat crude in execution. They appear in low relief, typically occupying all the space of the faces on both sides of the ampulla, though some have figureless decoration, usually centred on a cross, on the reverse face. There are often inscriptions and tituli in medieval Greek, many running round the outside of a face, or dividing an upper scene from a lower one. A smaller scene may occupy the lower part of a face, or scenes may appear in small roundels grouped across the overall design.

== Subjects ==
Subjects were linked with the most famous pilgrimage sites of the Holy Land, and especially Jerusalem, where the Church of the Holy Sepulchre contained both the greater part of the True Cross and the Tomb of Christ, as well as an altar dedicated to the Adoration of the Magi. Common subjects, which account for the great majority of the designs, are:

- The Life of Christ summarized in a number of scenes.
- The Adoration of the Magi combined with the Annunciation to the Shepherds; the ampullae are the first surviving depictions to show both Magi and shepherds together paying homage to the infant Jesus held by his mother, which remain very common throughout the later history of Christian art. As often later, a balanced composition is created by having the magi to the left of the Virgin and Child, and the shepherds to the right. It has been speculated that the compositions reflect a lost mosaic then in the apse of the Church of the Nativity, Bethlehem.
- The Baptism of Christ
- The Crucifixion of Jesus, where ampullae show the emerging depiction of the scene, which was a famously late arrival in the repertory of Christian imagery. The ampullae often show an empty cross with a bust of Christ above it, and kneeling pilgrims at its foot; this is thought to depict the scene around the large crux gemmata installed in the Church of the Holy Sepulchre at the time - some therefore prefer to call these scenes the Adoration of the Cross. The two thieves are often shown on their crosses even when Christ's central cross has no corpus, as in the Dumbarton Oaks example.

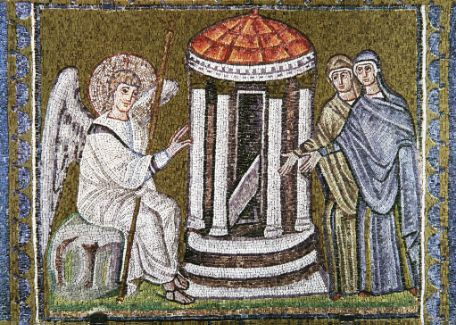
Early 6th-century mosaic in San Apollinare Nuovo, Ravenna, with a depiction of the Women at the empty tomb similar to that on ampullae, though reversed and with no censer.

- Jesus and Doubting Thomas; since these seem to have been sold at Jerusalem, not where the biblical episode was located in tradition, it seems these suggested a link between the experience of Thomas, who doubted until he saw and touched the physical evidence of Christ's wounds, and that of the pilgrim, whose faith was also reinforced by the sight of, and physical contact with, the scenes and relics of Christ's life.
- The Resurrection of Jesus, usually represented by the Women at the empty tomb, with the tomb represented by the "aedicula" or shrine built by Constantine I within the Church of the Holy Sepulchre on what was believed to be the appropriate spot. This is now covered or replaced by later accretions, and its 6th-century appearance is only known from such representations. Typically, two women approach from the left of the tomb, while an angel sits to its right. One of the women, perhaps to be identified as Mary Magdalene, often seems to be carrying a censer, suggesting to scholars a reflection of the contemporary rituals performed at the tomb. The door or lid of the tomb, which has been pushed aside by the angel to allow Christ to exit, may be represented by a lozenge shape, as in the mosaic at right, apparently reflecting the contemporary display in the aedicula.
- The Ascension of Jesus, usually with the Pentecost below.
- Saints, typically on the reverse side, with a New Testament scene on the obverse.

Fourteen of the Monza and Bobbio ampullae combine on one face Crucifixions above the Women at the empty tomb, which are also on the two faces in other examples. Two of the flasks, one each at Bobbio and Monza, show a large Christ walking on water and rescuing Saint Peter from drowning, as the other apostles watch from a boat, perhaps reflecting the anxieties of the sea voyages many pilgrims faced as they returned home. Another Bobbio scene shows a Virgin Orant flanked by John the Baptist and his father Zacharias. Figures that appear to be images of pilgrims, as a kind of generalised donor portrait, appear in many scenes, usually kneeling, as part of the emphasis on the pilgrim experience noted above in discussing the Doubting Thomas scenes.

== Context and style ==
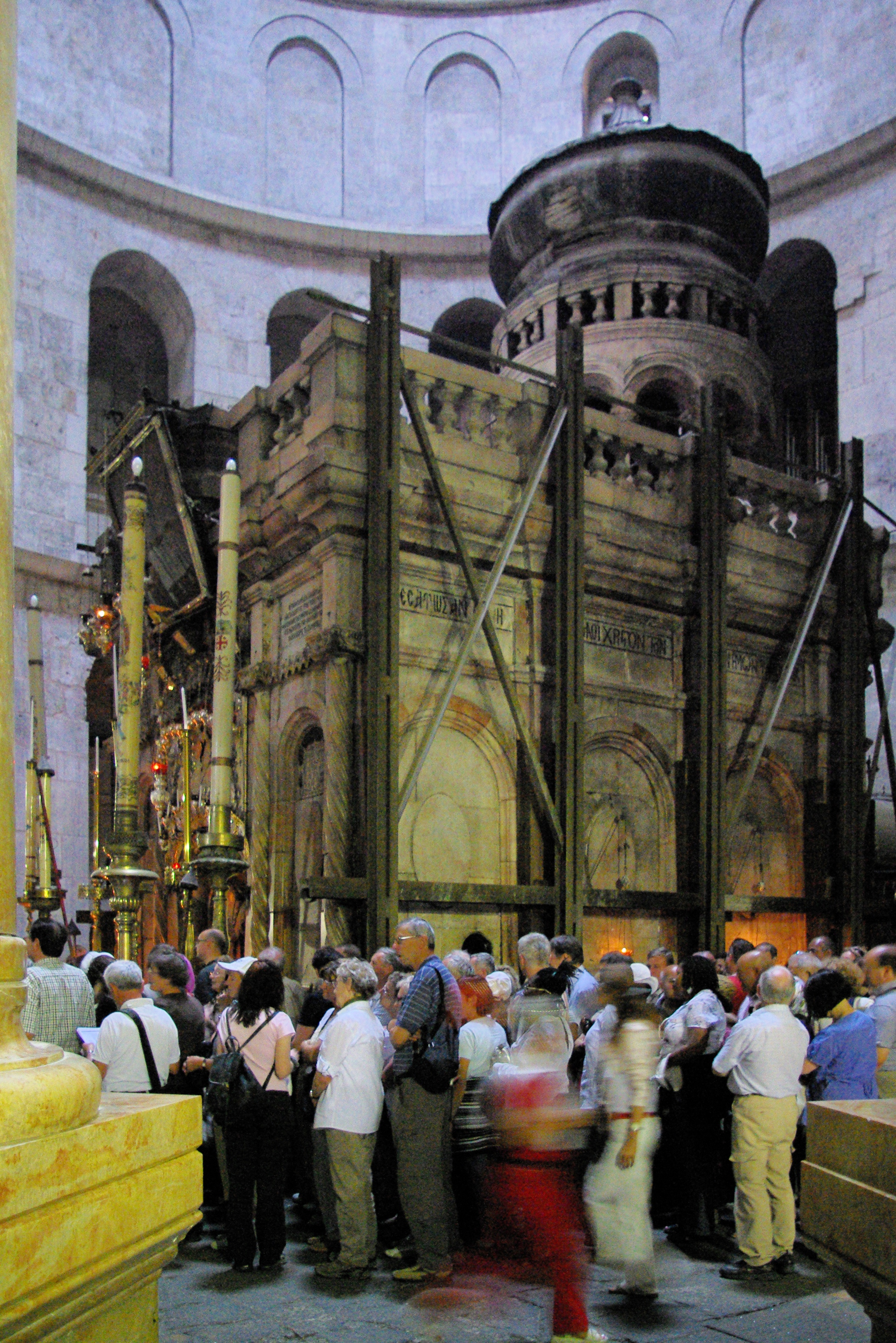
Modern pilgrims at the aedicule over the tomb of Christ in the Church of the Holy Sepulchre

The ampullae join other small-scale Christian works of art from this period, from which almost no major works have survived, and very few manuscript illuminations. These include amulets, devotional medals and other forms of pilgrimage souvenirs. Many of these are in the cheaper material of terracotta, such as the Menas flasks that have been found from Cheshire to the Sudan and come from Abu Mena in Egypt, the exceptionally popular shrine of Saint Menas. Small round terracotta "pilgrimage tokens" or ampullae for oil, water or earth from the Holy Land, are often excavated, and examples of the tokens are also in the Monza treasury; the Piacenza Pilgrim records that in the 570s earth was kept piled up in the tomb of Christ to be taken by pilgrims.

Most of these pieces, in the words of John Beckwith, "rate as works of art little more than a hot cross bun". However few of these works have images with the complexity of those on the ampullae. There is a small wooden box in the Vatican Museums containing earth and rocks from the Holy Land, some tied up in cloth and labelled with their site of origin. The inside of the top cover has five painted scenes from the New Testament relating to the main sites, or sights, on the pilgrimage route, in similar style to the ampullae, and believed to be made in Palestine in around 600.

It was long thought that the ampullae reflected the style of art of Palestine itself, and as such they became involved in the intense scholarly debate over "Oriental" influences on Early Medieval art, which preoccupied scholars of the subject in the early decades of the 20th century, and for which the style of Syria and Palestine was a key battleground. In his monograph of 1957, which for the first time gave scholars good images of all the Monza and Bobbio ampullae, and an extensive analysis of their iconography, André Grabar proposed instead that they derived from the style of Constantinople itself, spread to the provinces by Imperial patronage, which is clearly recorded for the major pilgrimage sites. This view has gained considerable influence. After the Persians under Khosrau II took and sacked Jerusalem in 614, and the Muslim conquest of the region in the 630s, pilgrimages to the Holy Land sites were greatly reduced, and pilgrim souvenirs with them.

With the exception of the somewhat variant example from Sant Pere de Casseres (see below), which may be later, it is usually assumed that all the Monza-type ampullae predate the Persian sack, and probably come from the late sixth century, a few years before Theodelinda's reign. After a nearly complete gap of three centuries or so, different styles of pilgrimage souvenirs begin to appear from the 10th century, reflecting rather different pilgrimage experiences and customs.

== Queen Theodelinda's gift ==
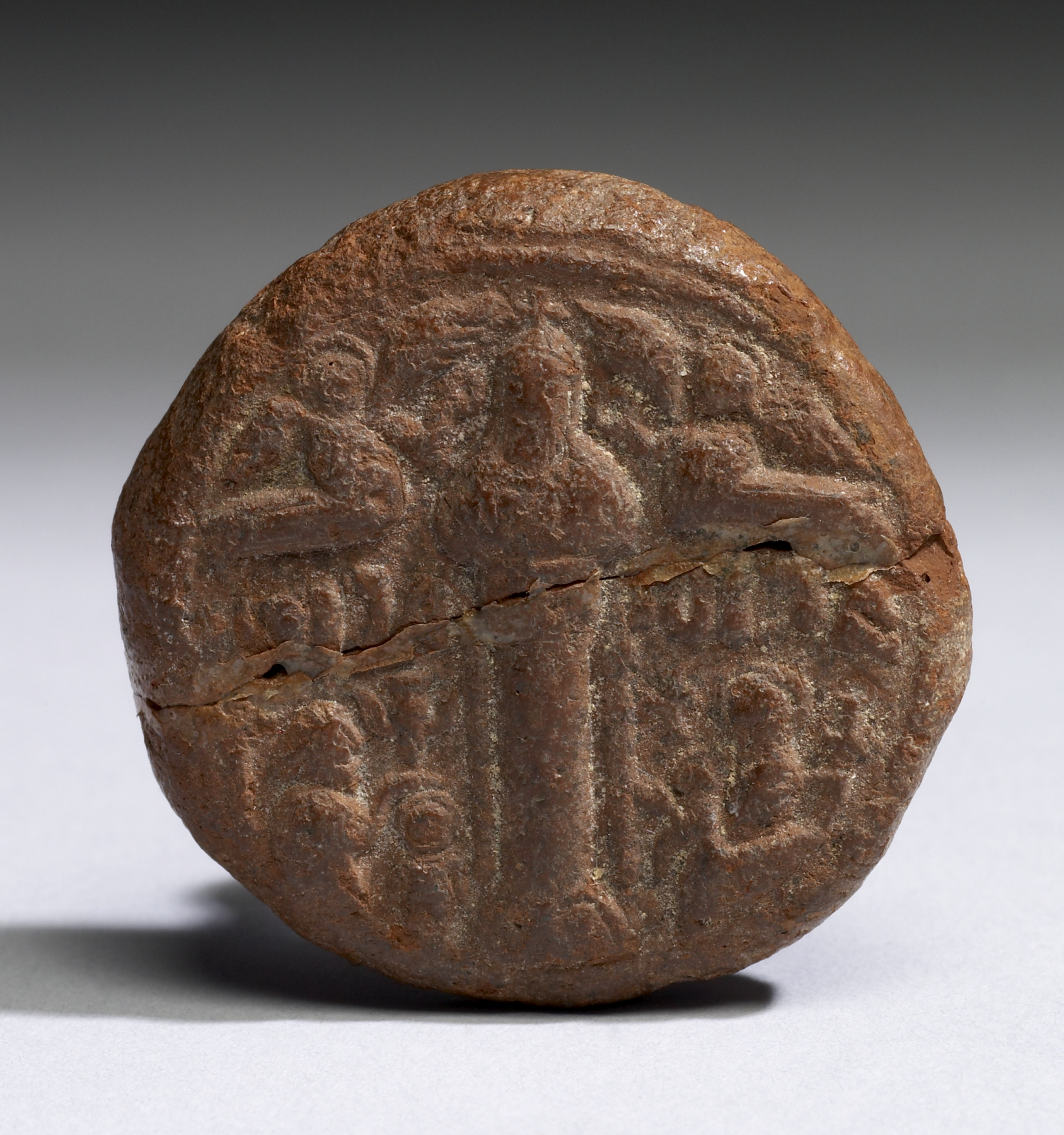
Syrian pilgrim token in clay from the shrine of St Symeon near Aleppo, 6th century

Theodelinda was a Bavarian princess who married Authari, King of the Lombards in 588. When he died in 590, she was allowed to choose his cousin Agilulf as her next husband and the next king. He was baptised, initially as an Arian like most Lombards, but Theodelinda persuaded him and his son to convert to Catholicism in 603. Together they founded the cathedral at Monza, and endowed it with many treasures, a collection which has remained unusually intact, and includes the Iron Crown of Lombardy (strictly only on deposit there initially), the Late Antique Poet and Muse diptych, a Gospel book and the collection of ampullae. An early inventory survives, although some objects traditionally associated with Theodelinda may actually be made well after her death in 628, when she was buried at Monza.

The collection in the treasury was famous, and later augmented by other royal gifts. It was taken to Avignon during the Avignon Papacy but later returned. However the ampullae were incorporated in the high altar and forgotten until rediscovered in the late 18th century. Their identification in the earlier inventories is complicated by the existence of a further set of glass vials, also used for holy oil. The notula ("little note"), a very early papyrus document, now itself regarded as a treasure, records that a cleric called John, during the reign of Pope Gregory the Great (died 604), transferred (the nature of the transaction, whether a gift from Gregory, or John, or a purchase, is not clear) to Theodelinda small containers with oil that had been in lamps burning before the tombs of saints in Rome. The saints are listed; it seems that in most cases, but not those of Saints Peter and Paul, the oil was blended from that used in several places. There is some scholarly confusion as to how this list relates to the glass and metal ampullae. The origin of ampullae other than those produced by John is unknown, although scholars are unanimous that, wherever they went afterwards, the metal ampullae had been made in Palestine. Gregory is recorded as presenting gifts to Theodelinda in 603 after the conversion of Agilulf and his son, and also sending holy oil in ampullae.

Bobbio Abbey was founded in 613 by the Irish missionary Saint Columbanus in 613, with land and funds from Theodelinda. The Bobbio ampullae were discovered in the 1920s in the crypt of the abbey church, and are presumed to have been given by Theodelinda or her family.

== Locations ==
Apart from the collections at Monza and Bobbio, other examples include two owned by the Staatliche Museen of Berlin and one in the Landesmuseum Stuttgart. Two examples in the United States, one at Dumbarton Oaks near Washington, D. C. and one in the Detroit Institute of Arts, appear to be cast from the same mould. There is an example with a Crucifixion and Ascension in the Cleveland Museum of Art (clear image online).

A single example was found in 1952 at the monastery church of Sant Pere de Casseres, near Tavèrnoles in Catalonia. As at Monza, it was discovered within the main altar, adapted as a reliquary for a piece of bone, and near a glass vial similarly used. It is made of an iron alloy, is rather larger than most at 7.5 cm high and 5.7 cm wide, and has two handles at the neck. The decoration is a Crucifixion on the obverse, and Greek cross on the reverse. This may be later than the Monza and Bobbio ampullae by some considerable time.

== Sources ==
- Arad, Lily. The Holy Land Ampulla of Sant Per de Cassarres, Miscellània Litúrgica Catalana, 15, 2007
- Beckwith, John. Early Christian and Byzantine Art, Penguin History of Art (now Yale), 2nd edn. 1979, ISBN 0-14-056033-5
- Burrus, Virginia. Late ancient Christianity, Fortress Press, 2005, ISBN 0-8006-3412-8, ISBN 978-0-8006-3412-4
- Dumbarton Oaks. Catalogue of the Byzantine and Early Mediaeval Antiquities in the Dumbarton Oaks Collection, Volume 1, Metalwork, Ceramics, Glass, Glyptics, Paintings by Marvin C. Ross, Dumbarton Oaks, 1962, ISBN 0-88402-009-6, ISBN 978-0-88402-009-7
- Elsner, Jaś, in Edwards, Catherine and Woolf, Greg (eds). Rome the Cosmopolis, Cambridge University Press, 2006, ISBN 0-521-03011-0, ISBN 978-0-521-03011-3
- Hackel, Sergei. The Byzantine Saint, St Vladimir's Seminary Press, 2001, ISBN 0-88141-202-3, ISBN 978-0-88141-202-4
- Hahn, Cynthia. The Meaning of Early Medieval Treasuries, in Reliquiare im Mittelalter, Volume 5 of Hamburger Forschungen zur Kunstgeschichte, eds. Bruno Reudenbach, Gia Toussaint, Akademie Verlag, 2005, ISBN 3-05-004134-X, 9783050041346
- King, Mike. Diamonds are Forever, 2001, Lecale Miscellany, 19. Web version from Down County Museum, accessed May 13, 2010
- Gregory the Great, Letters. ed. Jacques-Paul Migne, in Patrologiae cursus completus: sive biblioteca universalis, integra uniformis, commoda, oeconomica, omnium SS. Patrum, doctorum scriptorumque eccelesiasticorum qui ab aevo apostolico ad usque Innocentii III tempora floruerunt ... (in Latin), Volume 77, 1849
- Leroy, Jules, Review of André Grabar Les Ampoules de Terre Sainte, Syria. Archéologie, Art et Histoire, Vol 36, 1959 (in French)
- Milburn, Robert. Early Christian Art and Architecture, University of California Press, 1988, ISBN 0-520-06326-0, ISBN 978-0-520-06326-6
- Peers, Glen, Sacred Shock: Framing Visual Experience in Byzantium, Penn State Press, 2004, ISBN 0-271-02470-4, ISBN 978-0-271-02470-7
- Pitarakis, Brigitte, in Maria Vasilakē (ed), Images of the Mother of God: Perceptions of the Theotokos in Byzantium, Ashgate Publishing, Ltd., 2005, ISBN 0-7546-3603-8, ISBN 978-0-7546-3603-8
- Schiller, Gertud. Iconography of Christian Art, Vol. I, 1971, Vol. II, 1972 (English trans from German), Lund Humphries, London, ISBN 0-85331-270-2 (I), 0853313245 (II)
- "Vikan (1982)": Vikan, Gary. Byzantine Pilgrimage Art, Issue 5 of Byzantine Collection Publications, Dumbarton Oaks, Trustees for Harvard University, 1982
- "Vikan (1998)": Vikan, Gary. Byzantine Pilgrimage Art, in Safran, Linda (ed). Heaven on Earth: art and the Church in Byzantium, Penn State Press, 1998, ISBN 0-271-01670-1, ISBN 978-0-271-01670-2
- Wharton, Annabel Jane. Selling Jerusalem: Relics, Replicas, Theme Parks, University of Chicago Press, 2006, ISBN 0-226-89422-3, ISBN 978-0-226-89422-5
