= Unguentarium =

Small ceramic or glass bottle

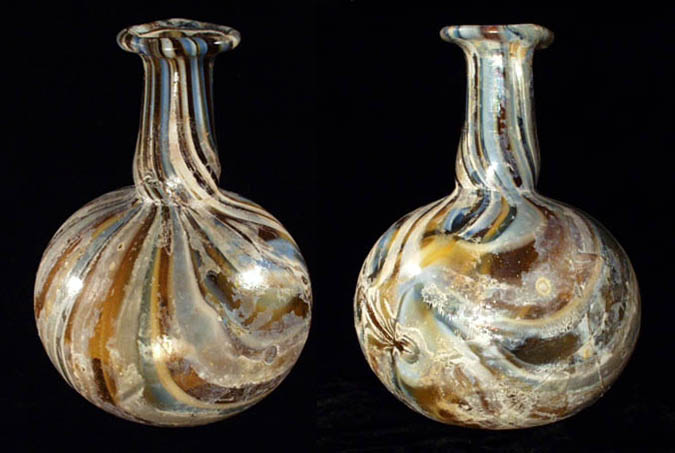
Roman marbled glass piriform unguentarium (front and back)

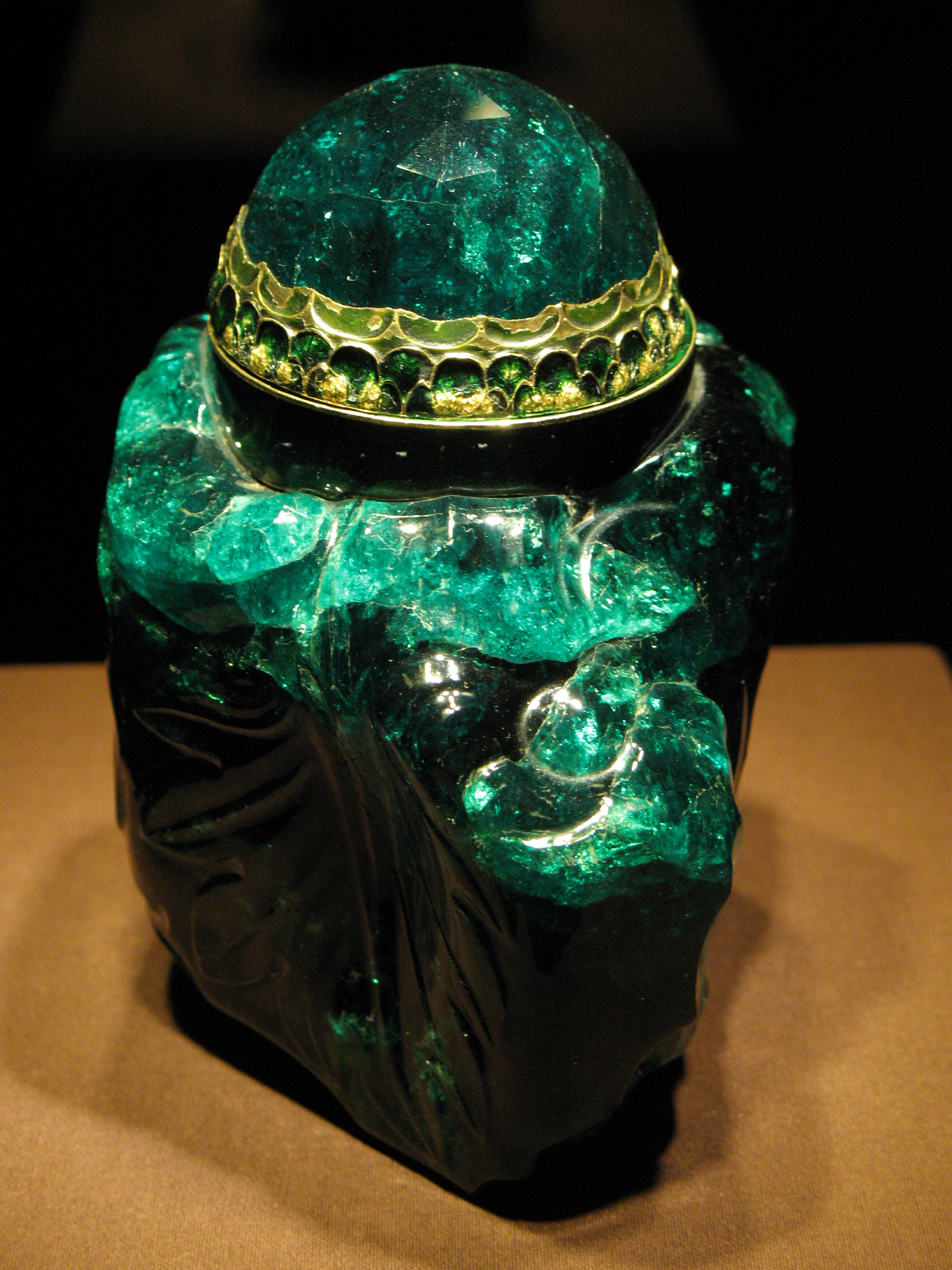
Unguentarium carved from a 2860-carat Colombian emerald, Habsburg-Lorraine Household Treasure, Imperial Treasury, Vienna.

An unguentarium (pl.: unguentaria), also referred to as balsamarium (pl.: balsamaria), lacrimarium (pl.: lacrimaria) or tears vessel, is a small ceramic or glass bottle found frequently by archaeologists at Hellenistic and Roman sites, especially in cemeteries. Its most common use was probably as a container for oil, though it is also suited for storing and dispensing liquid and powdered substances. Some finds date into the early Christian era. From the 2nd to the 6th century they are more often made of blown glass rather than clay. A few examples are silver or alabaster.

Unguentaria were used as product packaging in commerce and for funerary practice. They are distributed throughout the Mediterranean region of the Roman Empire from Israel to Spain, and north into Britain and Germania. Their manufacture was nearly as widespread.

== Forms and function ==
The term unguentarium is functional rather than descriptive; that is, it refers to the purpose for which this relatively small vessel is thought to have been used and is not typological by shape. In its early development, the shape was modeled in miniature after larger amphoras, which would have been the original bulk shipping containers for products sold in the unguentaria. An unguentarium is not always distinguished in the scholarly literature from an ampulla, a term from antiquity that may refer to these as well as other small vessels. In scholarship of the modern era, an unguentarium is sometimes called a lacrimarium ("tear-container") or balsamarium ("balsam-container"). All three terms reflect modern usage based on assumptions about their use, and no single word is found in ancient sources for the vessels.

Small vessels of two shapes, usually but not always without handles, are referred to as unguentaria:

- Fusiform – The fusiform shape (example here) is characteristic of Hellenistic unguentaria: a heavy ovoid body resting usually on a small distinct ring foot, with a long tubular neck or cylindrical stem. The shape is comparable to a spindle (Latin fusus, "spindle"). These ovoid unguentaria first appear in Cyprus around the turn of the 4th and 3rd centuries BC. and may have been Near Eastern in origin or influence. Early examples are similar in shape to the amphoriskos. They are believed to develop functionally from the lekythos, which they replace by the end of the 4th century BC. The fusiform unguentarium was in use for several centuries and the form shows many variations, including later examples with very slender profiles.
- Piriform – The unguentarium with a footless body that is rounded or pear-shaped (Latin pirus, "pear") began to appear in the second half of the 1st century BC and is characteristic of the Roman era, particularly the early Principate. These are regularly associated with graves in the 1st century. The piriform unguentarium was in use for a limited period of about a hundred years and did not replace the fusiform. An exception to this chronology is the squat rounded unguentarium with painted bands found on the northeast coast of Spain and in other Iberian cemeteries, dated as early as the 5th century BC.

The word bulbous is used rather confusingly in the scholarship to describe both forms. "Bulbous" appears as a synonym for "piriform", but is applied descriptively to the fusiform to distinguish certain examples from more slender profiles.

Thin blown-glass bottles began to appear in Cyprus after the middle of the 1st century BC. The use of the new medium for unguentaria resulted in variations of form, including the thin, "test-tube" type. Glass unguentaria made in Thessaly, for example, often have a distinctive conical body, flared like the bell of a trumpet, or are squat and rounded with a very long neck; they come in a range of colors including aquamarine, pale green, and yellowish green, or may be colorless. This shape was popular in the 2nd and 3rd centuries and is also characteristic of Thrace and Cyprus.

Glass bird-shaped containers for cosmetics found at various Roman sites from Herculaneum to Spain have also been called unguentaria. In these examples, dating from the period of the piriform type, the neck has become a spout, and the profile is no longer vertical. As with other unguentaria, no clear distinction can be made between the use of these vessels for grooming in daily life, and their inclusion in tombs.

== Commercial and secular use ==
In her typology of Hellenistic vessels at Athens used to contain and pour oil, Susan I. Rotroff classes unguentaria with plastic askoi as used for perfumed oil in bathing and grooming, but notes the diversity of craft tradition associated with them. Most unguentaria from the Athenian agora were probably intended for secular use, as they are found in household dumps; the pattern of deposition in some wells, however, suggests votive offerings.

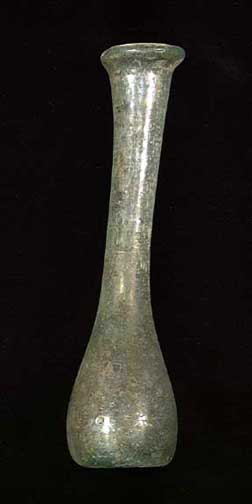
Roman glass unguentarium, 2nd century; asymmetry may indicate mass production

It has been suggested that products shipped in bulk containers were dispensed for sale in these smaller vessels. Perfumed oils, ointments, balsam, jasmine, kohl, honey, mastic, incense, scent powders and cosmetic preparations are among the contents proposed by scholars or evidenced by archaeology. With their long slender necks, the vessels were most suited for dispensing liquids, oils, and powders. Roman examples of bulbous unguentaria have been found with traces of olive oil. A sharp distinction should not be made between cosmetics and medicaments, as ingredients for these preparations often overlap. Chemical analysis of red and pink substances in two glass unguentaria from the Ebro valley in Spain showed that they were likely cosmetics, but similar ingredients are found in therapeutic recipes. The name "unguentarium" may be misleading, as solid unguents, or ointments, would be difficult to remove through the narrow neck. There is little or no evidence of how the contents were prevented from spilling, as no corks, wax or clay seals, or lead stoppers have been found with unguentaria as they have with other vessels.

The manufacture of unguentaria seems to occur in conjunction with the marketing of products. Roman glass unguentaria often have markings or lettering, usually on the base, that could indicate the manufacturer of the vessel or the supplier or dealer of the product inside. Nabataean piriform wheel-thrown unguentaria show creative variations by potters, perhaps to establish brand identity for the product they contained. These vessels include some of the larger unguentaria and may have been used for shipping as part of the Nabataeans' active perfume trade.

Mass production of Roman blown-glass unguentaria is indicated by their frequent asymmetry, which results from speed and timing in shearing the neck from the blow-pipe. Recycled glass, as from a large, heavy broken bottle, could have been used to make many of the smaller unguentaria.

== Funerary and religious context ==
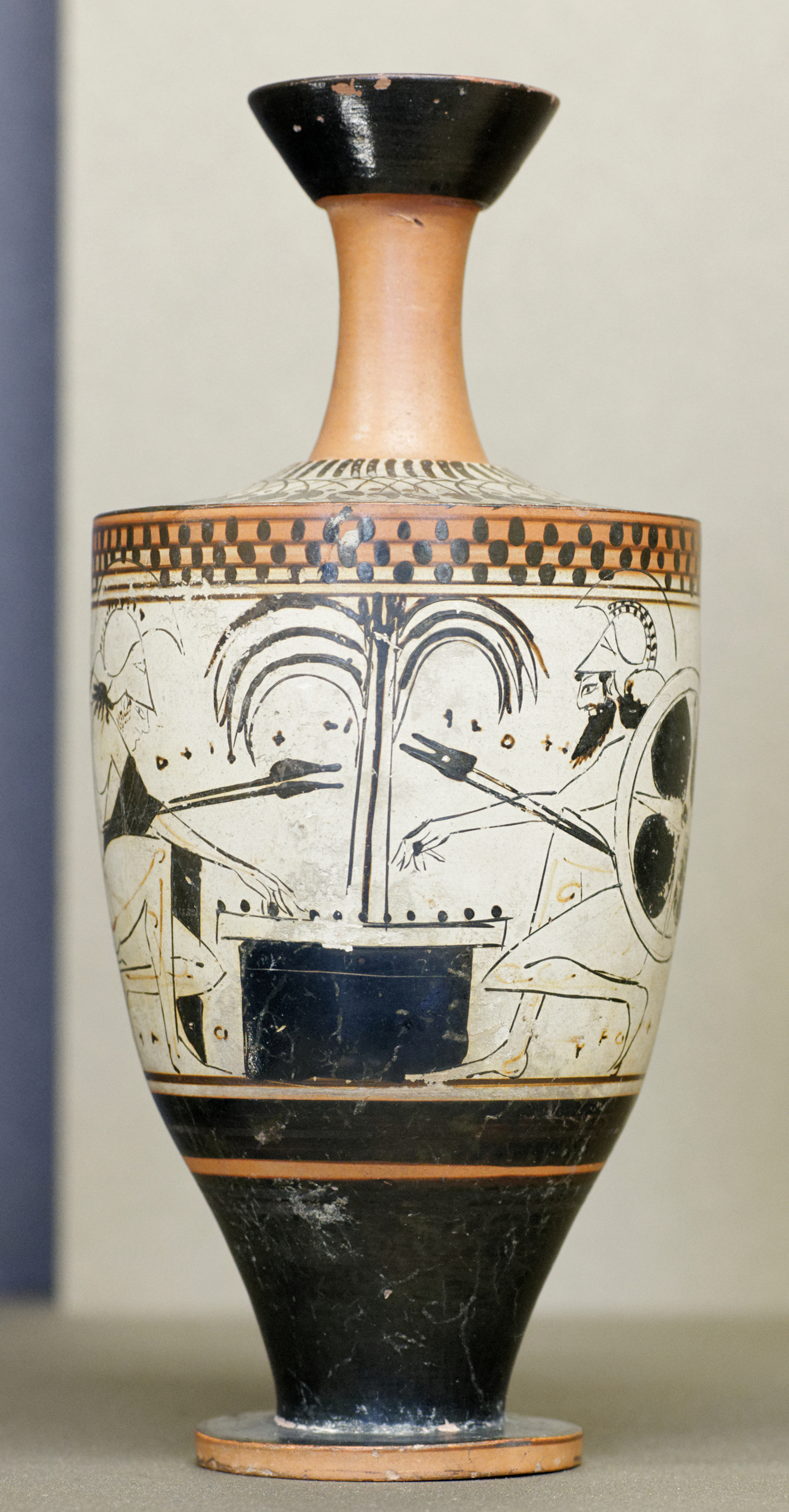
Achilles and Ajax play knucklebones on this late 6th-century lekythos, a type of oil-storing vessel associated with funeral rites before the unguentarium replaced it

While unguentaria often appear among grave goods, the purpose of their inclusion has not been determined with certainty or may vary by site. Unguentaria found in burials range in size from miniatures (4–5 cm.) to large examples 20 to 30 cm. high. The presence of the vessel in Hellenistic graves may indicate a revival of an earlier practice, attested in the 6th century by aryballoi and in some 5th- and early 4th-century burials by small lekythoi, which involved the deposit of a small container of perfume or oil with the dead. By the 3rd century, the black-figure lekythos with palmettes or Dionysiac scenes has been completely replaced as a standard grave good by the undecorated, "cruder" unguentarium, indicating a shift in burial practice that is characteristic of the period.

Although the unguentaria seem often to have been buried along with other objects associated with or treasured by the deceased or as grave gifts, they may have also held a substance — such as oil, wine, or powdered incense — for a graveside ritual. The design of many unguentaria would not permit them to stand without support, but no stands have been found. Late Hellenistic gravestones depict unguentaria resting in a support, but they would also fit well in the palm of the hand, as shown in this Egyptian mummy portrait. Ritual dispensing, rather than long-term storage, might explain both the lack of durability needed for use in daily life and the absence of stands, stoppers or seals.

There is no standard assemblage of grave goods for which an unguentarium was required. Unguentaria often appear among articles for personal grooming; in one example, with a stone cosmetics palette, strigils, tweezers and a pyxis, and in another, with a pyxis, mirror, bronze scissors and tongs. Gravestones from Anatolia depict the deceased with a similar group of objects, including mirror, comb, boxes and cistai, wool basket, and unguentaria. One Athenian burial produced five bulbous unguentaria along with five knucklebones and a bronze needle; another, of a female child, contained an unguentarium, earrings, a blue glass pendant, and six knucklebones. Gold leaves and unguentaria were the grave gifts in a burial chamber at Kourion in Cyprus.

At Amisos (modern Samsun) in the Black Sea region of Turkey, the grave goods in the early Hellenistic tomb of a wealthy family were exceptionally rich and of outstanding workmanship, but the unguentaria were plain and made of clay. One of the bodies was adorned with gold earrings in the shape of Nike, ten gold appliqués of Thetis riding a hippocamp, snake bracelets and bracelets with lion-head terminals, and other gold items; on the right side of the skull was placed a single clay unguentarium.

Some graves contain multiple unguentaria, in one case numbering 31 of the fusiform type, while others hold a single example. Grave gifts sometimes consisted of nothing but unguentaria. Neither the piriform unguentaria nor thin blown-glass vessels occur in burials before the Augustan period. In Mainz, unguentaria are the most common grave gifts made of glass during the first half of the 1st century; in Gaul and Britain, glass unguentaria appear as containers for scented oils in both cremations and inhumations in this period and continuing into the 3rd century, but disappear by the 4th.

The grave goods of Jewish ossuaries at Jericho in the Second Temple period often include unguentaria along with bowls, lamps, and various vessels ordinarily encountered in daily life.

Unguentaria have also been found in Athens in ritual pyres along with the burnt bones of animal sacrifice and smashed pottery. A single unguentarium was buried with a dog, possibly a pet, in an industrial district in Athens.

The many unguentaria at the Latin town of Aricia reflect the growth of commerce to support ritual activities at the famous sanctuary of Diana there.

== Examples ==
Most ceramic unguentaria either lack surface decoration or have simple horizontal lines around the neck or body consisting most often of three narrow bands of white paint.

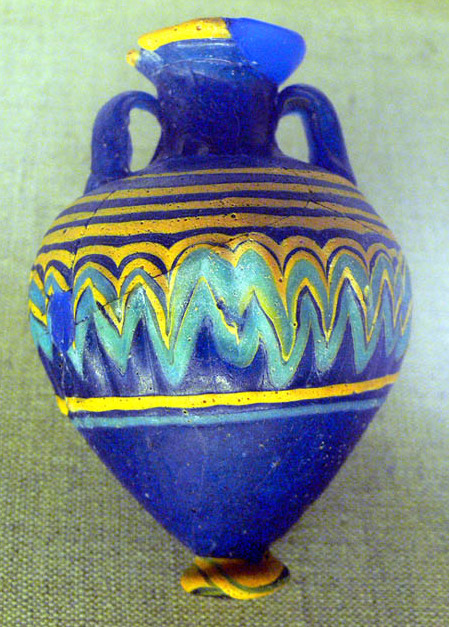
Punic unguentarium found in the Phoenician necropolis of Puig des Molins

Glass unguentaria vary widely in quality and show a range of colors. The Judean desert caves, for instance, yielded unguentaria of aquamarine glass with large bubbles. A striking example of a glass fusiform unguentarium from 1st-century Syria, a little over six inches tall, has a white spiral curling around the cerulean body. The base comes to an elongated, rounded point, and the lip is well-formed and prominent. Techniques of "marbling," intended to emulate fashionably extravagant vessels made of sardonyx during the reigns of Augustus and Tiberius, were used for unguentaria as well as bowls.

An exceptionally elaborate unguentarium was found in a cremation burial at Stobi in North Macedonia. Made of milky glass, the vessel has a globular body decorated with an egg-and-dart motif around the top and festoons and vine clusters around the bottom. The middle had six panels illustrating various vessels, with two examples each of the hydria, oenochoe and crater.

== In literature ==
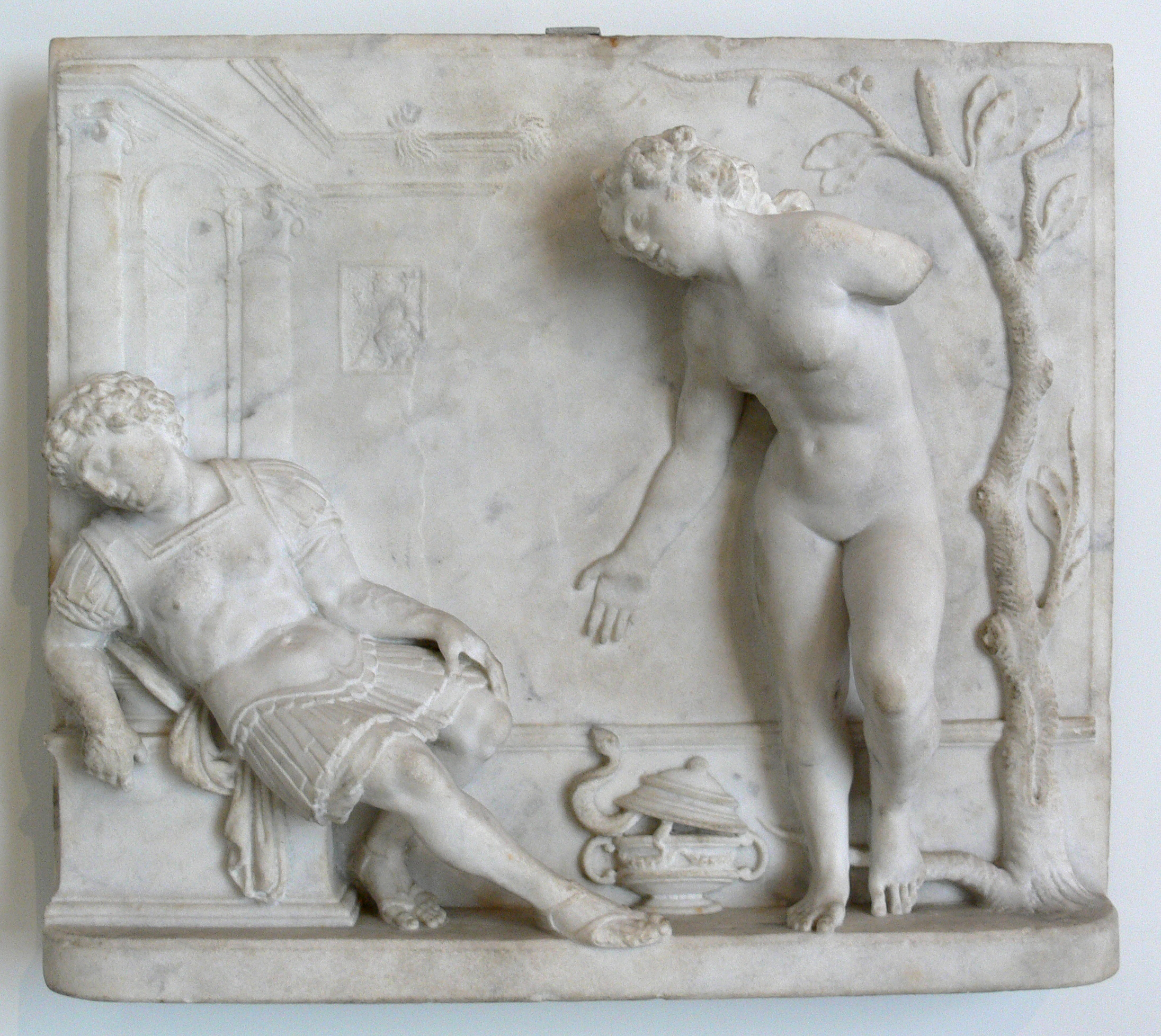
Antony and Cleopatra, 16th century marble relief by Giovanni Maria Mosca.

The use of the term "lacrimarium" or "lacrimatorium" (also "lacrymatory" or "lachrymatory") for unguentaria persisted because the small vessels were believed to have been used to collect the tears (lacrimae) of mourners to accompany the beloved in the grave. This belief was supported by a scriptural reference (Psalm 56.8) translated in the King James Bible as "put thou my tears into thy bottle." Shakespeare refers to the practice in Antony and Cleopatra, when Cleopatra chides the Roman for shedding few tears over the death of his wife: "Where be the sacred vials thou shouldst fill / With sorrowful water?"

The minor Victorian poet Charles Tennyson Turner, brother of the more famous Tennyson, wrote a sonnet called "The Lachrymatory," elaborating the idea of "the phial of his kinsman’s tears." Likewise, Frank Dempster Sherman's 1896 ode "A Tear Bottle" addresses the "glass, wherein a Greek girl's tears / Once were gathered as they fell." However, since the early 20th century, the use of a vessel to collect tears of grief has been regarded as more poetic than plausible.

== See also ==
- Pottery of ancient Greece
- Typology of Greek Vase Shapes
- Roman glass
- Ampulla
- Monza ampullae

== Selected bibliography ==
Anderson-Stojanovic, Virginia R. "The Chronology and Function of Ceramic Unguentaria." American Journal of Archaeology 91 (1987) 105–122.

Fleming, Stuart James. Roman Glass: Reflections on Cultural Change. University of Pennsylvania Museum of Archaeology, 1999. ISBN 0-924171-73-1

Khairy, Nabil I. "Nabataean Piriform Unguentaria." Bulletin of the American Schools of Oriental Research 240 (1980) 85–91.

Robinson, Henry S. "Pottery of the Roman Period: Chronology." In The Athenian Agora, vol. 5. American School of Classical Studies at Athens, 1959.

Pérez-Arantegui, Josefina, with Juan Ángel Paz-Peralta and Esperanza Ortiz-Palomar. "Analysis of the Products Contained in Two Roman Glass unguentaria from the Colony of Celsa (Spain)." Journal of Archaeological Science 23 (1996) 649–655.

Rotroff, Susan I. "Hellenistic Pottery: Athenian and Imported Wheelmade Table Ware and Related Material," part 1: text. The Athenian Agora 29 (1997) iii–575. ISBN 0-87661-229-X (full text online).

Rotroff, Susan I. "Fusiform Unguentaria." In "Hellenistic Pottery: The Plain Wares." The Athenian Agora 33 (2006), pp. 137–160. ISBN 0-87661-233-8 (full text online).

Thompson, Homer A. "Two Centuries of Hellenistic Pottery." Hesperia 4 (1934) 311–476. Edited by Susan I. Rotroff and reprinted with other essays in Hellenistic Pottery and Terracottas (American School of Classical Studies at Athens, 1987). ISBN 0-87661-944-8
