= Ampulla =

Small vessel used in ancient Rome

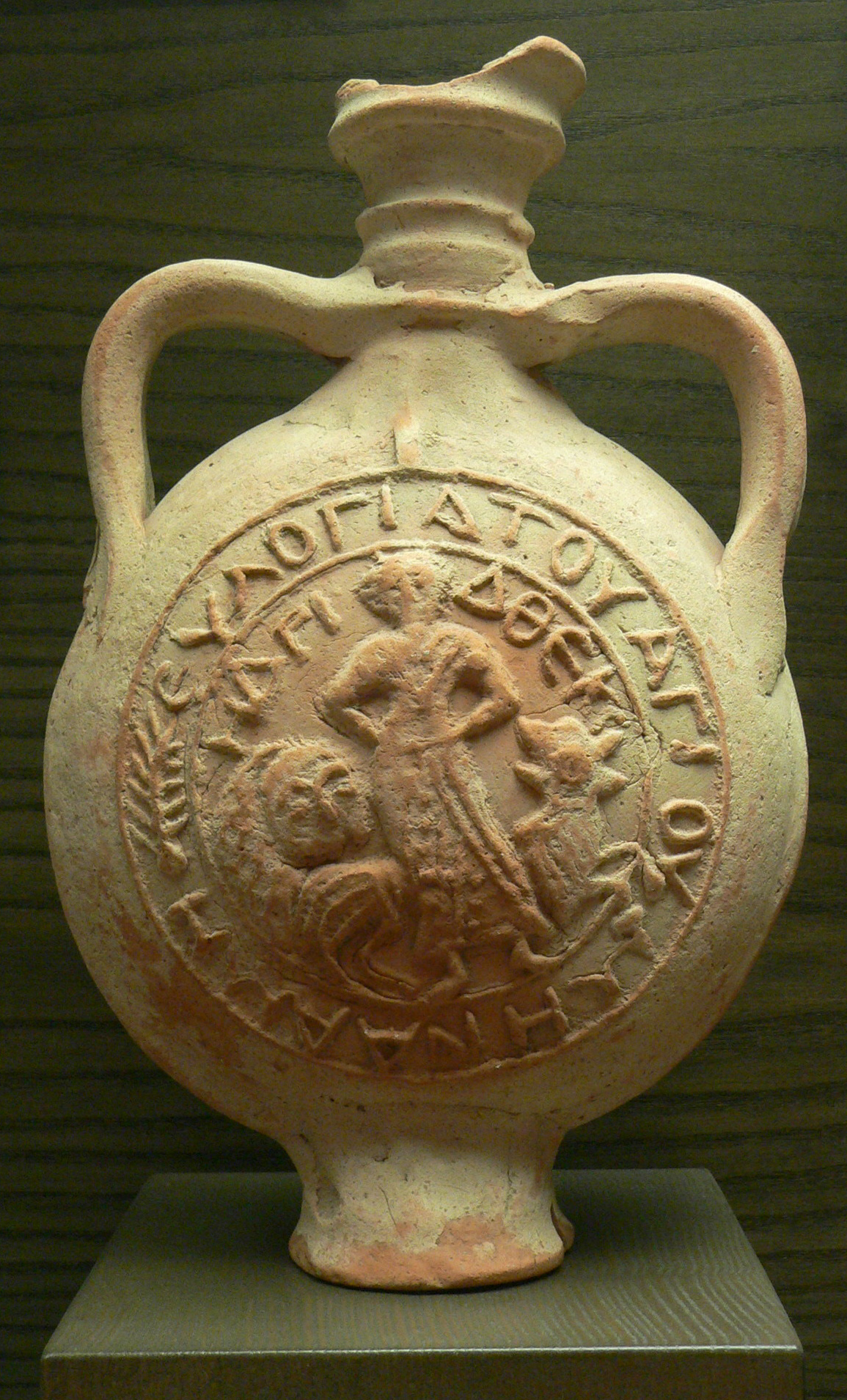
Eulogy ampulla representing St. Menas and St. Thecla (terracotta, 6th century, Louvre Museum)

An ampulla (/æmˈpʊlə, -ˈpʌl-/; pl.: ampullae) was, in ancient Rome, a small round vessel, usually made of glass and with two handles, used for sacred purposes. The word is used of these in archaeology, and of later flasks, often handle-less and much flatter, for holy water or holy oil in the Middle Ages, often bought as souvenirs of pilgrimages, such as the metal Monza ampullae of the 6th century. Materials include glass, ceramics and metal. Unguentarium is a term for a bottle believed to have been used to store perfume, and there is considerable overlap between the two terms, one defined by shape and the other by purpose.

The glass Holy Ampulla was part of the French coronation regalia and believed to have divine origins. Similar, but far more recent, is the Ampulla in the British regalia, a hollow, gold, eagle-shaped vessel from which the anointing oil is poured by the Archbishop of Canterbury at the anointing of a new British sovereign at their coronation. The Danish ampulla, used during the king's anointing in the period of absolutism, is cylindrical in shape, made of gold, and decorated with enameled flower motifs and diamonds.

== See also ==
- Ampoule
