= Diptych =

Object made of two paired flat plates, often joined by a hinge

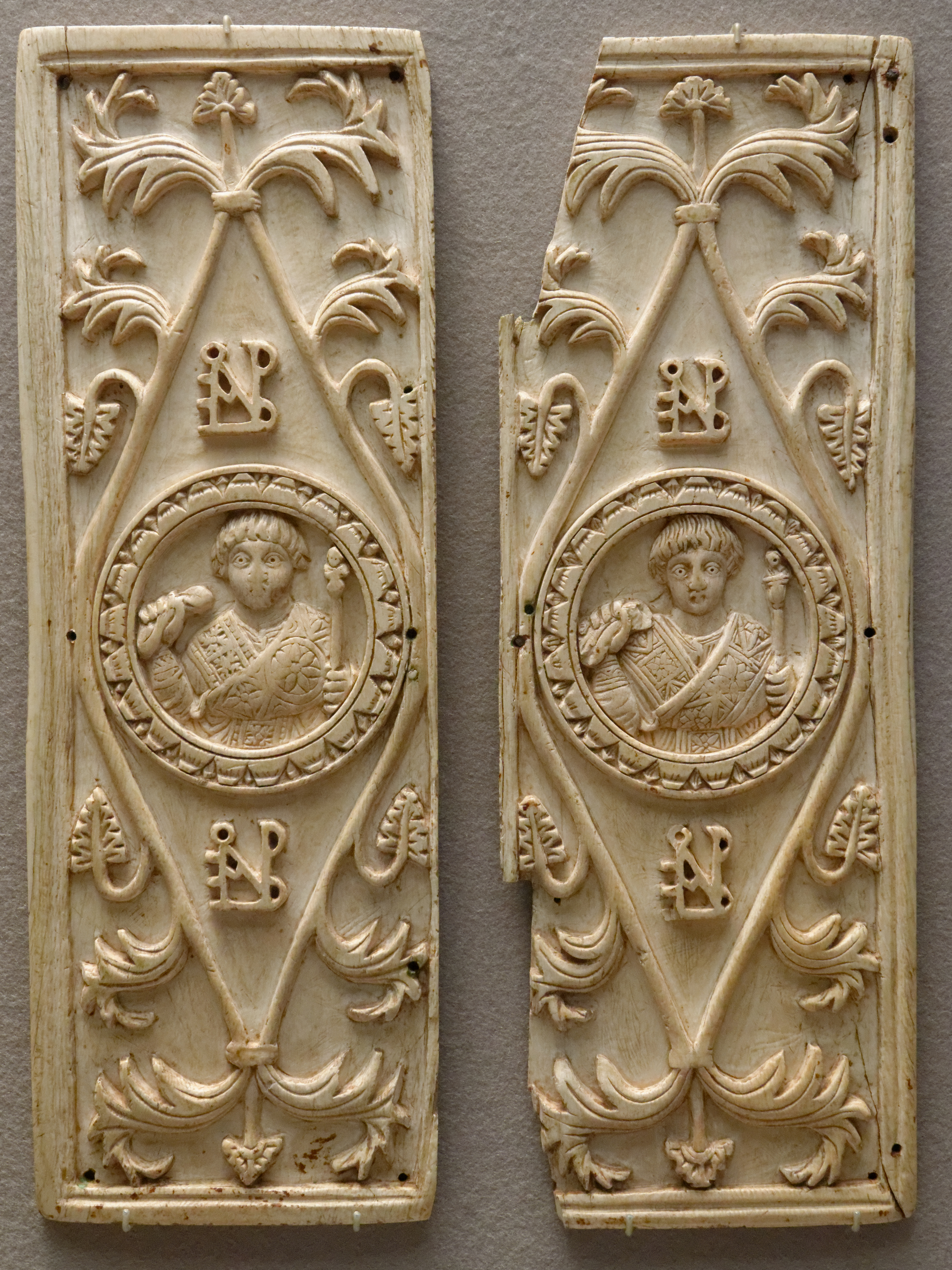
Ivory consular diptych of Areobindus, Byzantium, 506 AD, Louvre

Wax tablet and a Roman stylus

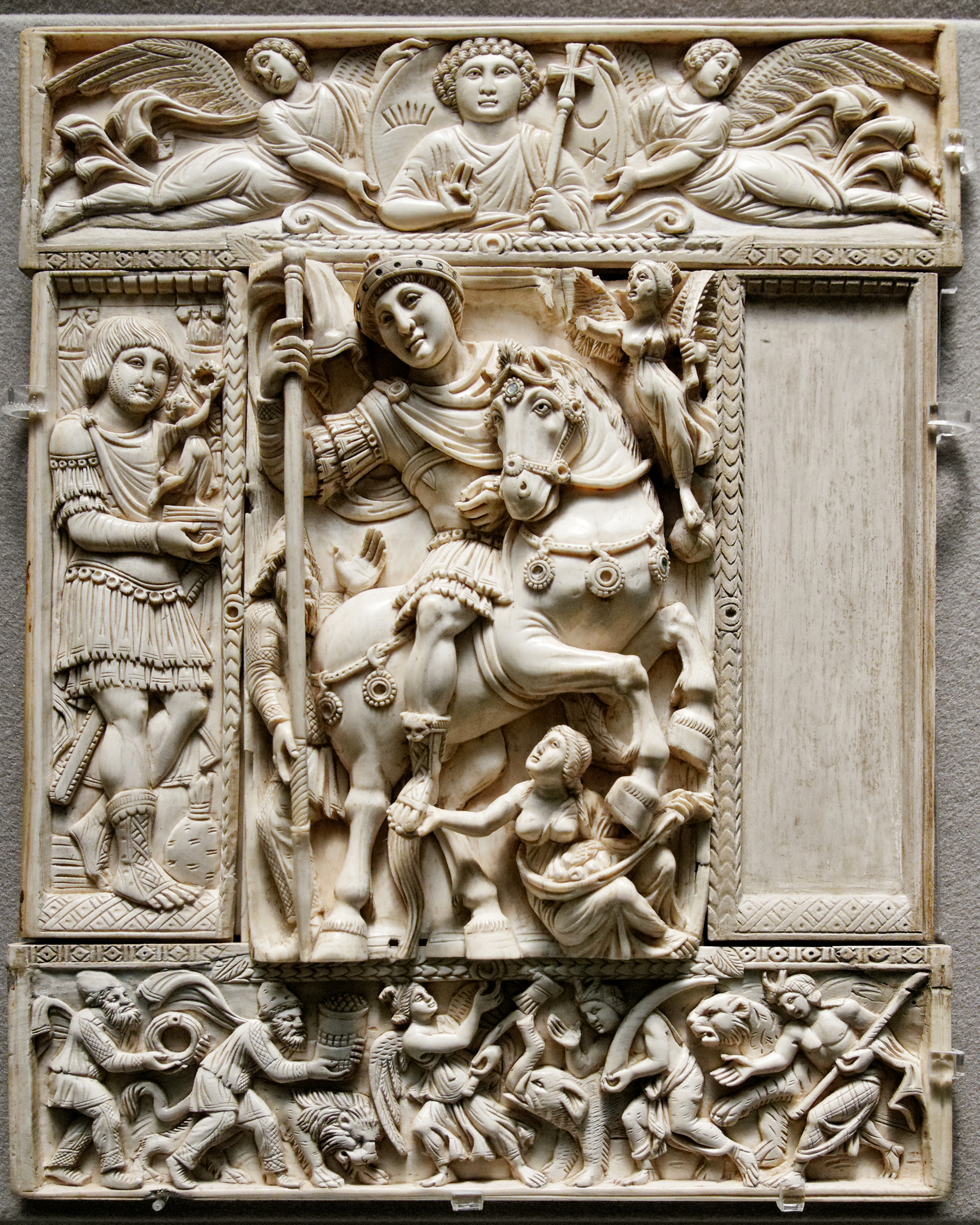
Barberini Ivory, Constantinople, 6th century, Louvre

A diptych (/ˈdɪptɪk/ DIP-tik) is an object made up of two flat plates or panels that form a pair, often joined by a hinge. In the ancient world, for example, the standard notebook or school exercise book often took the form of a diptych: two plates with recessed surfaces filled with wax. Writing was done by scratching the wax surface with a stylus. When the notes were no longer needed, the wax could be gently heated and smoothed for reuse. Ordinary diptychs usually had wooden frames, while more luxurious examples were made from costlier materials.

== Etymology ==
The word diptych is borrowed from the Latin diptycha, which itself is derived from the Late Greek δίπτυχα (díptycha) 'pair of writing tablets'. δίπτυχα is the neuter plural of δίπτυχος (díptychos) 'double-folded'.

== Art ==
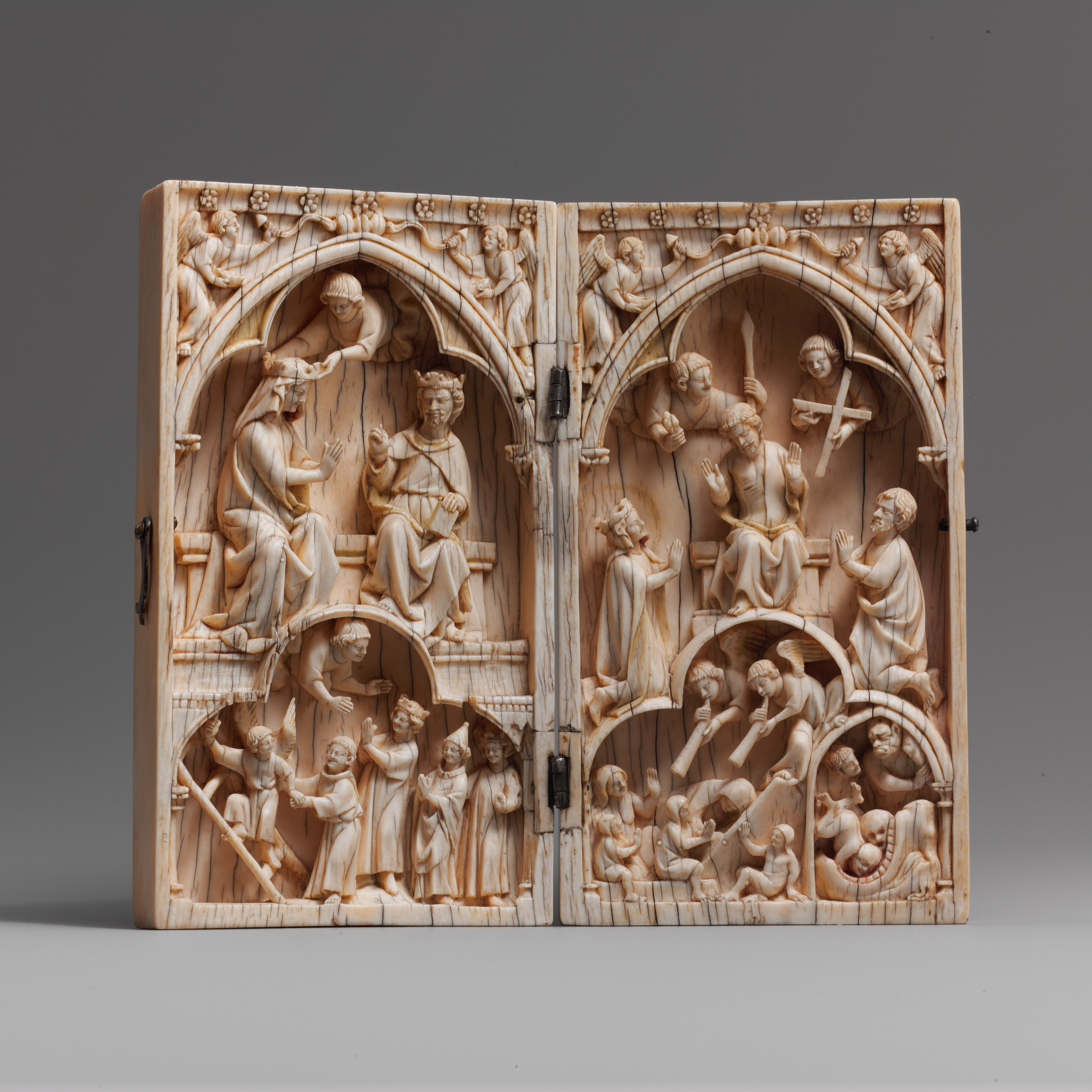
Diptych with the Coronation of the Virgin and the Last Judgment, Metropolitan Museum of Art

As an art term a diptych is an artwork consisting of two pieces or panels that together create a single art piece. These can be fastened together or presented adjoining each other. In medieval times, panels were often hinged so that they could be closed and the artworks protected.

In Late Antiquity, ivory notebook diptychs with covers carved in low relief on the outer faces were a significant art-form: the "consular diptych" was made to celebrate an individual's becoming Roman consul, when they seem to have been made in sets and distributed by the new consul to friends and followers. Others may have been made to celebrate a wedding, or, perhaps like the Poet and Muse diptych at Monza, simply commissioned for private use. Some of the most important surviving works of the Late Roman Empire are diptychs, of which some dozens survive, preserved in some instances by being reversed and re-used as book covers. The largest surviving Byzantine ivory panel (428 mm × 143 mm), is a leaf from a diptych in the Justinian court manner of c. 525–550, which features an archangel.

From the Middle Ages many panel paintings took the diptych form, as small portable works for personal use; Eastern Orthodox ones may be called "travelling icons". Although the triptych form was more common, there were also ivory diptychs with religious scenes carved in relief, a form found first in Byzantine art before becoming very popular in the Gothic period in the West, where they were mainly produced in Paris. These suited the mobile lives of medieval elites. The ivories tended to have scenes in several registers (vertical layers) crowded with small figures. The paintings generally had single subjects on a panel, the two matching, though by the 15th century one panel (usually the left one) might contain a portrait head of the owner or commissioner, with the Virgin or another religious subject on the other side. The outsides, which often received considerable wear from travelling, might have simpler decorative designs, including the coat of arms of the owner.

Large altarpieces tended to be made in triptych form, with two outer panels that could be closed across the main central representation. They are one type of the multi-panel forms of painting known as polyptychs.

The diptych was a common format in Early Netherlandish painting and depicted subjects ranging from secular portraiture to religious personages and stories. Often a portrait and a Madonna and Child had a leaf each. It was especially popular in the 15th and 16th centuries. Painters such as Jan van Eyck, Rogier van der Weyden, Hans Memling and Hugo van der Goes used the form. Some modern artists have used the term in the title of works consisting of two paintings never actually connected, but intended to be hung close together as a pair, such as Andy Warhol's Marilyn Diptych (1962) which is a modern pop culture icon.

"Diptych" is also often used in reference to films or pieces of literature that form a complementary pair. When taken together, they are viewed as illuminating each other and comprising a distinct work of art from the individual parts. An example is the pair of Alan Ayckbourn plays, House and Garden. The street artist Banksy has regularly used the diptych format for a variety of his studio produced artworks including Girl with Balloon. The diptych version of the work is made from spray paint on canvas with each panel measuring 30 x 30 cm and was released in an edition of 25 in 2005.

== Ecclesiastical ==
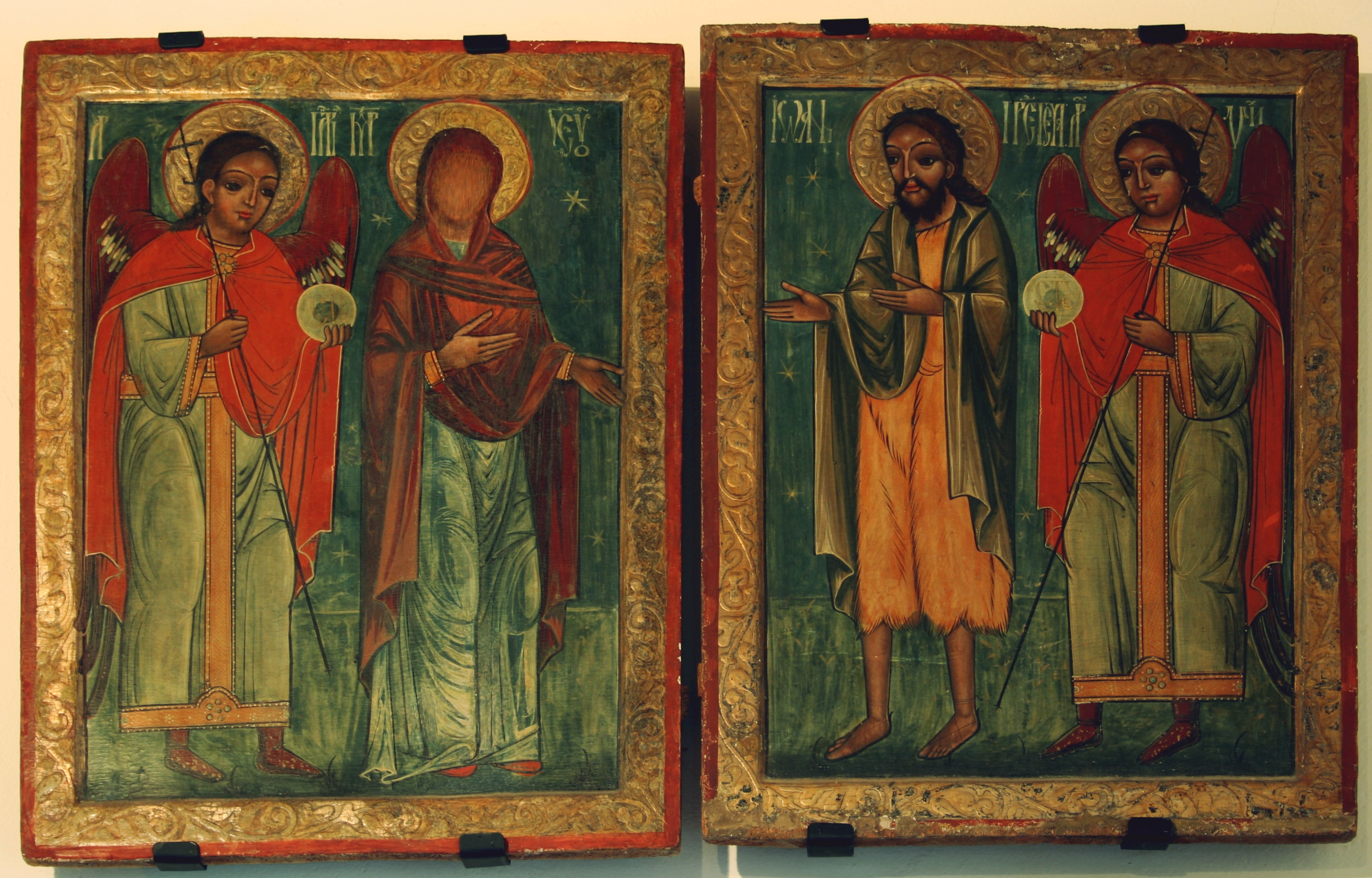
Deesis, 17th-century icon. Left to right: Archangel Michael, Theotokos, John the Baptist, Archangel Gabriel (Historical Museum in Sanok, Poland).

It is in this form that the mention of "diptychs" in early Christian literature is found. The term refers to official lists of the living and departed that are commemorated by the local church. The living would be inscribed on one wing of the diptych, and the departed on the other. The inscribing of a bishop's name in the diptychs means that the local church considers itself to be in communion with him, the removal of a bishop's name would indicate breaking communion with him. The names in the diptychs would be read publicly by the deacon during the Divine Liturgy (Eucharist), and by the priest during the Liturgy of Preparation. Diptychs were also used to inscribe the names of the saints. Although the wax tablets themselves are no longer used, the term is still used in the Eastern Orthodox Church, Oriental Orthodox Church, and Eastern Catholic Churches to describe the contents of the diptychs, with all the same connotations.

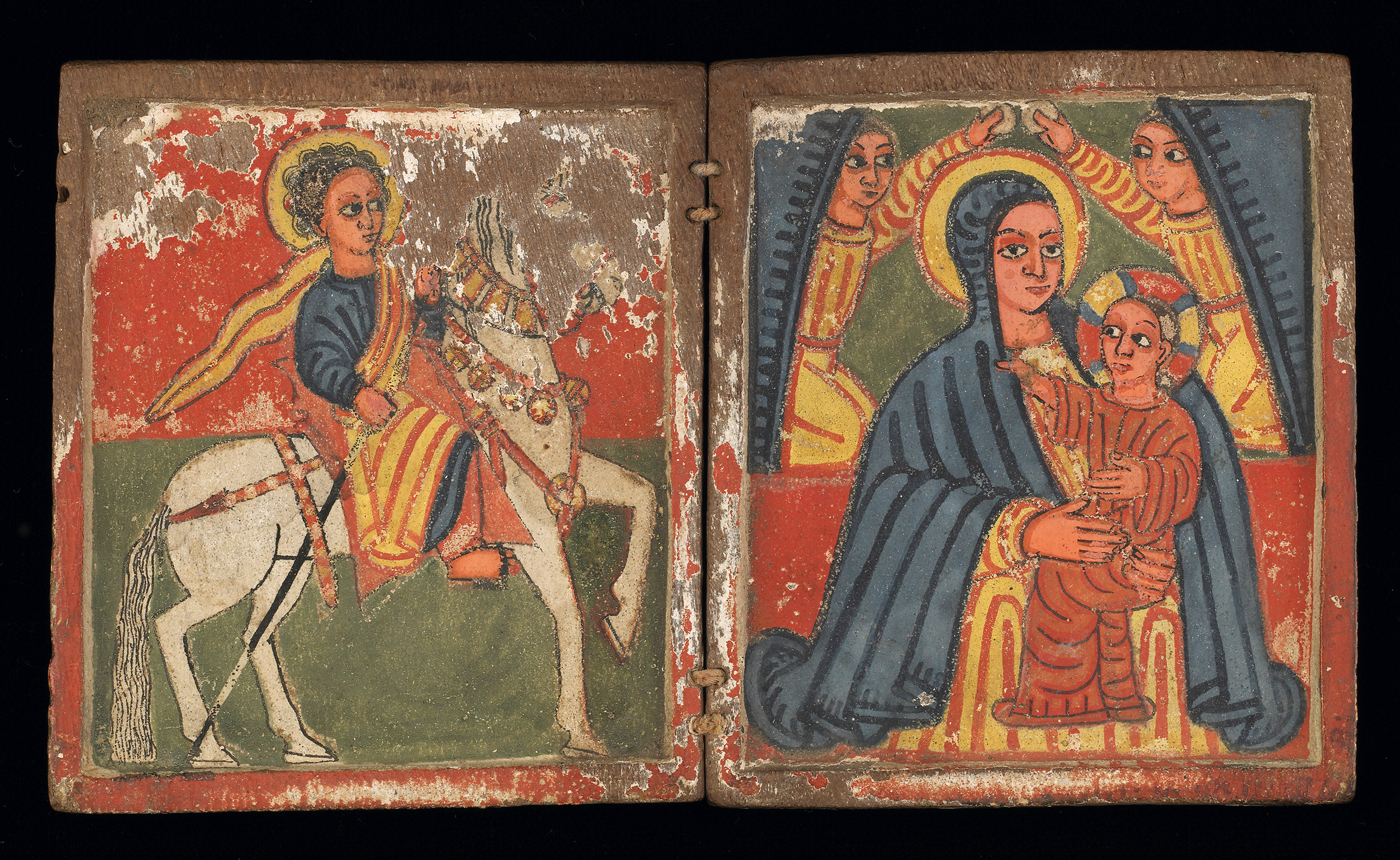
Ethiopian Orthodox wooden diptych of St. Mary and the infant Jesus with archangels above them. St. George appears on a white horse on the left. (Late 16th-early 17th century)

== Diptych sundial ==
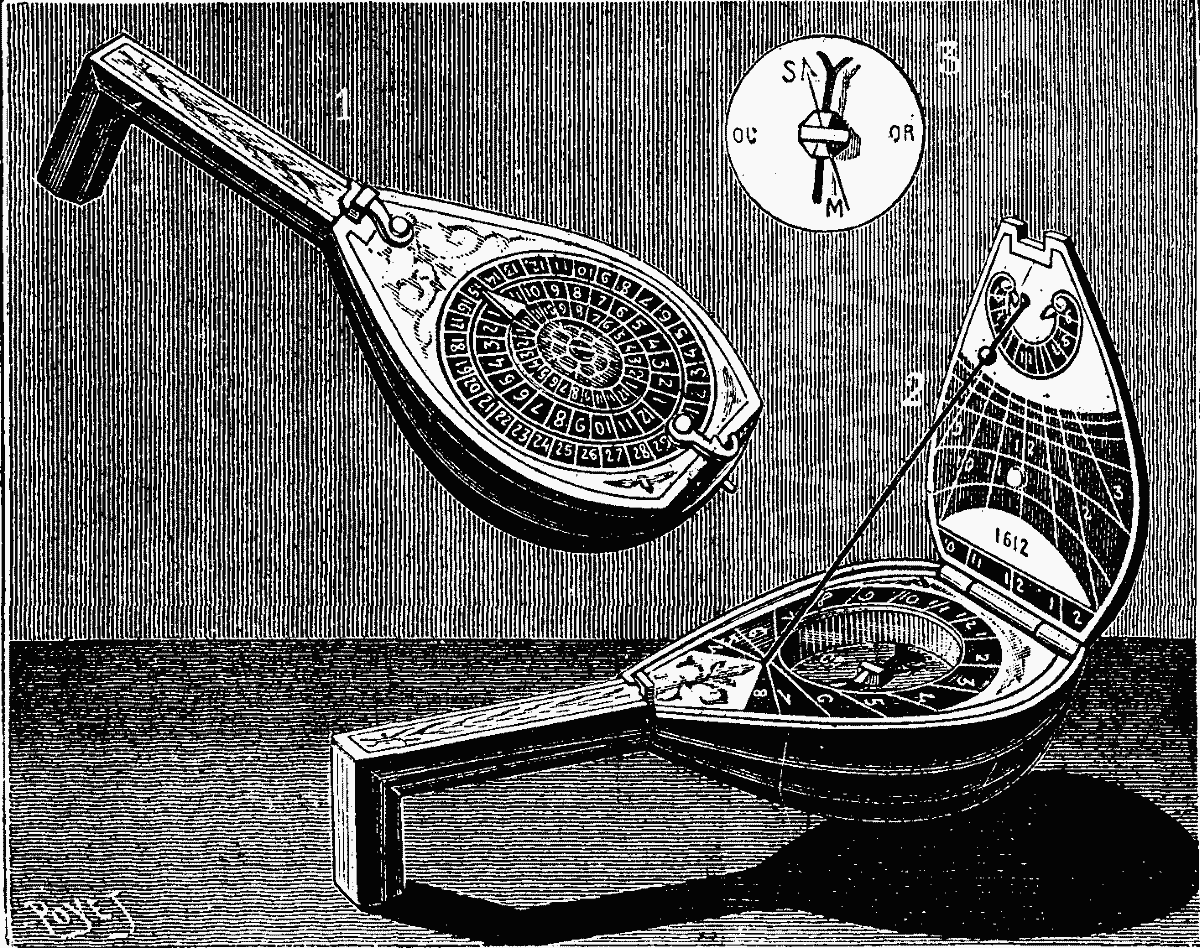
Diptych sundial in the form of a lute, c. 1612

A face was on the inside of each leaf. One leaf formed a vertical sundial, the other a horizontal sundial. The shadow caster, or gnomon, was a string between them, and calibrated as to how far they should open, as the angle is critical. Such a sundial can be adjusted to any latitude by tilting it so its gnomon is parallel to the Earth's axis of rotation. A common error states that if both dials show the same time, the instrument is oriented correctly and faces north (in the northern hemisphere). A Diptych made as stated as a combined vertical and horizontal sundial with a string gnomon will show the same time on both dials regardless of orientation. This property of self alignment is only true for diptychs historically in the case for a combination of an analemmatic and a vertical sundial. A double dial on a flat plate consisting of a horizontal and an analemmatic dial will also be aligned properly if both dials show the same time.

Some diptychs had rough calendars, in the form of pelekinons calibrated to a nodus in the form of a bead or knot on the string. These are accurate to about a week, which was good enough to time planting of crops.

== See also ==
- Triptych
- Polyptych

== Bibliography ==
- Marco Cristini: Eburnei nuntii: i dittici consolari e la diplomazia imperiale del VI secolo. In: Historia: Zeitschrift für Alte Geschichte 68 (2019), pp. 489–520.
- Wolfgang Kermer: Studien zum Diptychon in der sakralen Malerei: von den Anfängen bis zur Mitte des sechzehnten Jahrhunderts: mit einem Katalog. Düsseldorf: Dr. Stehle, 1967 (Phil. Diss. Tübingen 1966)
- Ralf Kern: Wissenschaftliche Instrumente in ihrer Zeit. Vom 15. – 19. Jahrhundert. Verlag der Buchhandlung Walther König 2010, ISBN 978-3-86560-772-0
