= Duomo of Monza =

Religious building in Monza, Italy

Basilica of St John the Baptist Duomo di San Giovanni Battista (in Italian)
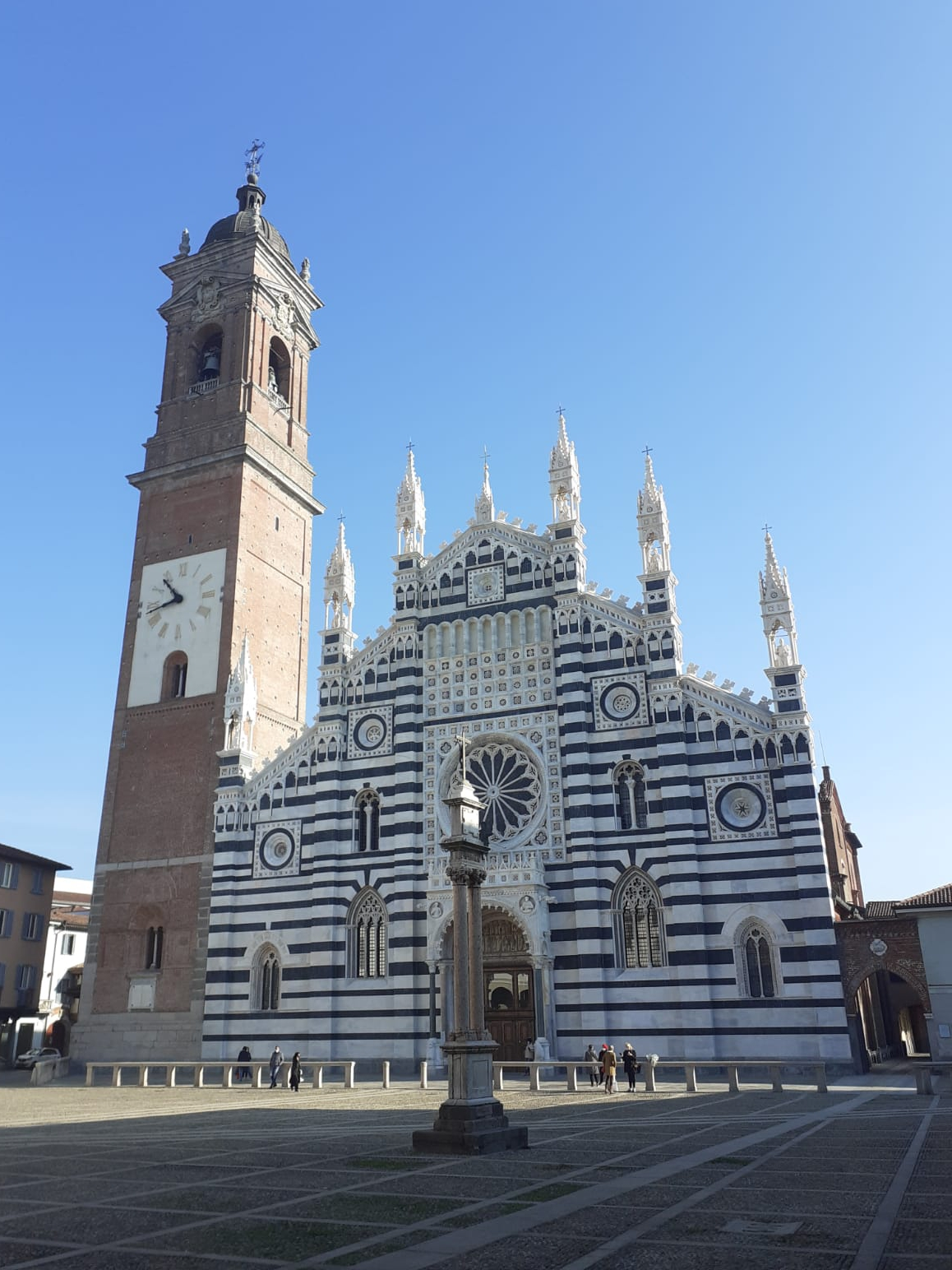
- Façade of the Duomo

Religion
- Affiliation: Catholic
- Province: Archdiocese of Milan
- Rite: Latin Rite

Location
- Location: Monza, Italy
- Interactive map of Basilica of St John the Baptist; Duomo di San Giovanni Battista (in Italian)
- Coordinates: 45°35′01″N 9°16′33″E

Architecture
- Style: Italian Gothic
- Groundbreaking: 1300
- Completed: 1681
- Direction of façade: West

The Duomo of Monza (Italian: Duomo di Monza), often known in English as Monza Cathedral, is the main religious building of Monza, Italy. Unlike most duomi, it is not in fact a cathedral, as Monza has always been part of the Diocese of Milan, but is in the charge of an archpriest who has the right to certain episcopal vestments including the mitre and the ring. The church is also known as the Basilica of San Giovanni Battista from its dedication to John the Baptist.

== History ==
The basilica, which would in essence have been completed by 603 when heir to the Lombard throne Adaloald was baptised here by Secundus of Non, is believed to have been commissioned towards the end of the sixth century by the Lombard Queen of Italy, Theodelinda, as a royal chapel to serve the nearby palace. According to the legend she had made a vow to build a church dedicated to Saint John the Baptist, and when riding along the banks of the Lambro River, she was halted by a dove who told her Modo (Latin for "now"), to which she replied Etiam ("yes"). Monza itself was initially known as Modoetia.

In 595, she had a oraculum (chapel) built on the Greek Cross plan; of this chapel only the walls exist today. The queen was buried here, in what is now the central left aisle of the church. On the remains of the oraculum, a new church was erected in the 13th century. It was again rebuilt as a basilica, starting from 1300, on a Latin Cross plan with an octagonal tiburium. In the late 14th century, the side chapels were added and, as designed by Matteo da Campione, the Pisan-Gothic style west front in white and green marble was begun.

Starting from the 16th century, the choir and the ceiling were restored. Subsequently, the walls and the vaults were decorated with frescoes and stucco-work. The bell tower was erected in 1606. In the 18th century a cemetery was annexed on the left side.

== West front ==
The massive west front is divided into five parts by six lesene (applied strips), each of which is surmounted by a tabernacle housing a statue. The façade has several mullioned windows with, in the centre, a large rose window framed by a motif inspired by Roman antique ceilings, decorated with rosettes, masks and star motifs.

The façade is considered Romanesque in its structure and Gothic in its decoration. Typical of the latter is the porch, with 14th century gargoyles on the sides and the 13th century lunette with the 16th century busts of Theodelinda and King Agilulf. Over the porch is the statue of Saint John the Baptist (15th century). Over the portal is depicted the Baptism of Jesus, assisted by Saint Peter, the Blessed Virgin Mary, Saint Zachary and Saint Paul. In the upper section is portrayed Theodelinda offering to John the Baptist the Iron Crown of Lombardy, together with her kneeling husband Agilulf and their children Adaloald and Gundeberga.

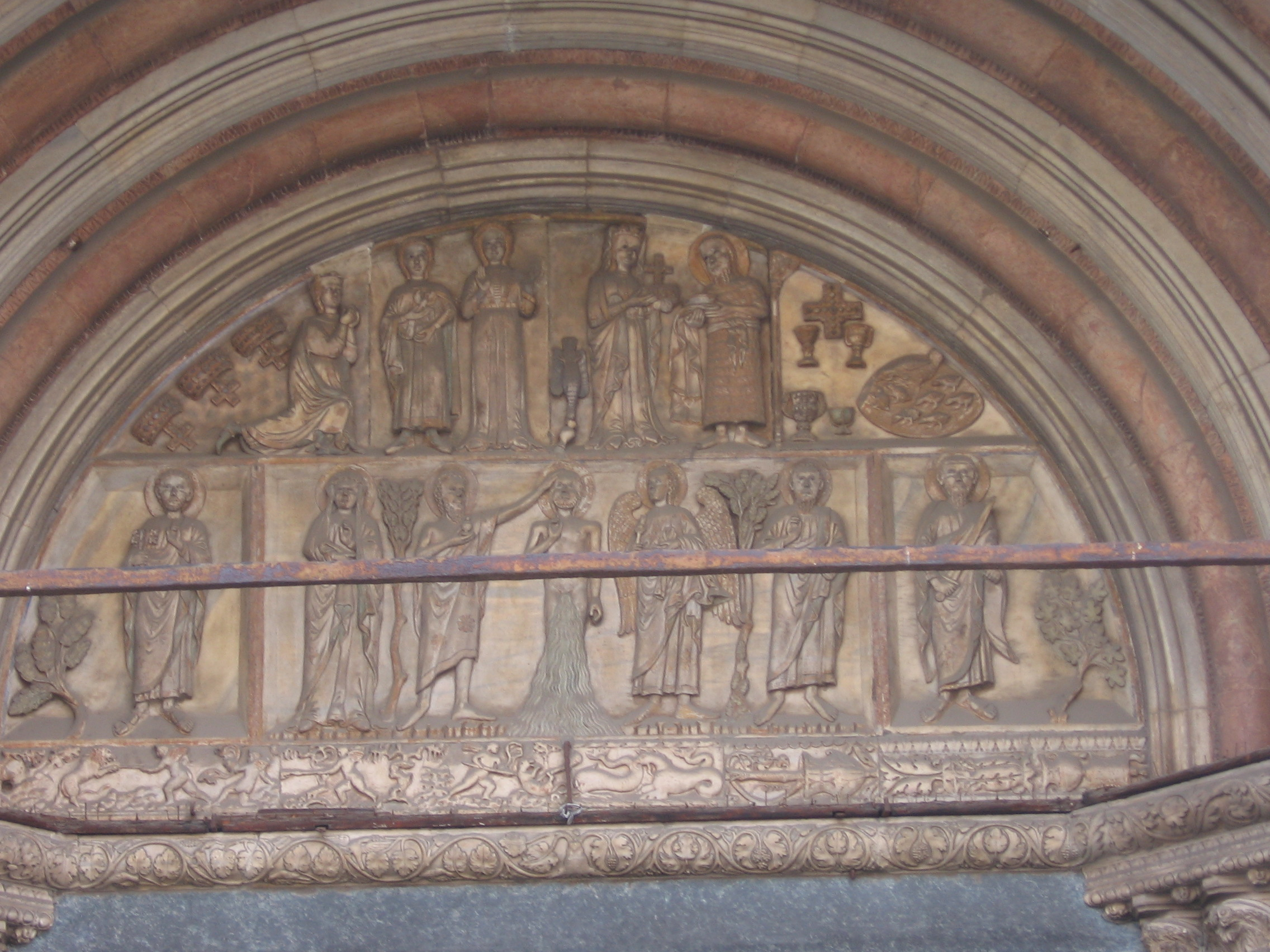
Lunette over the portal

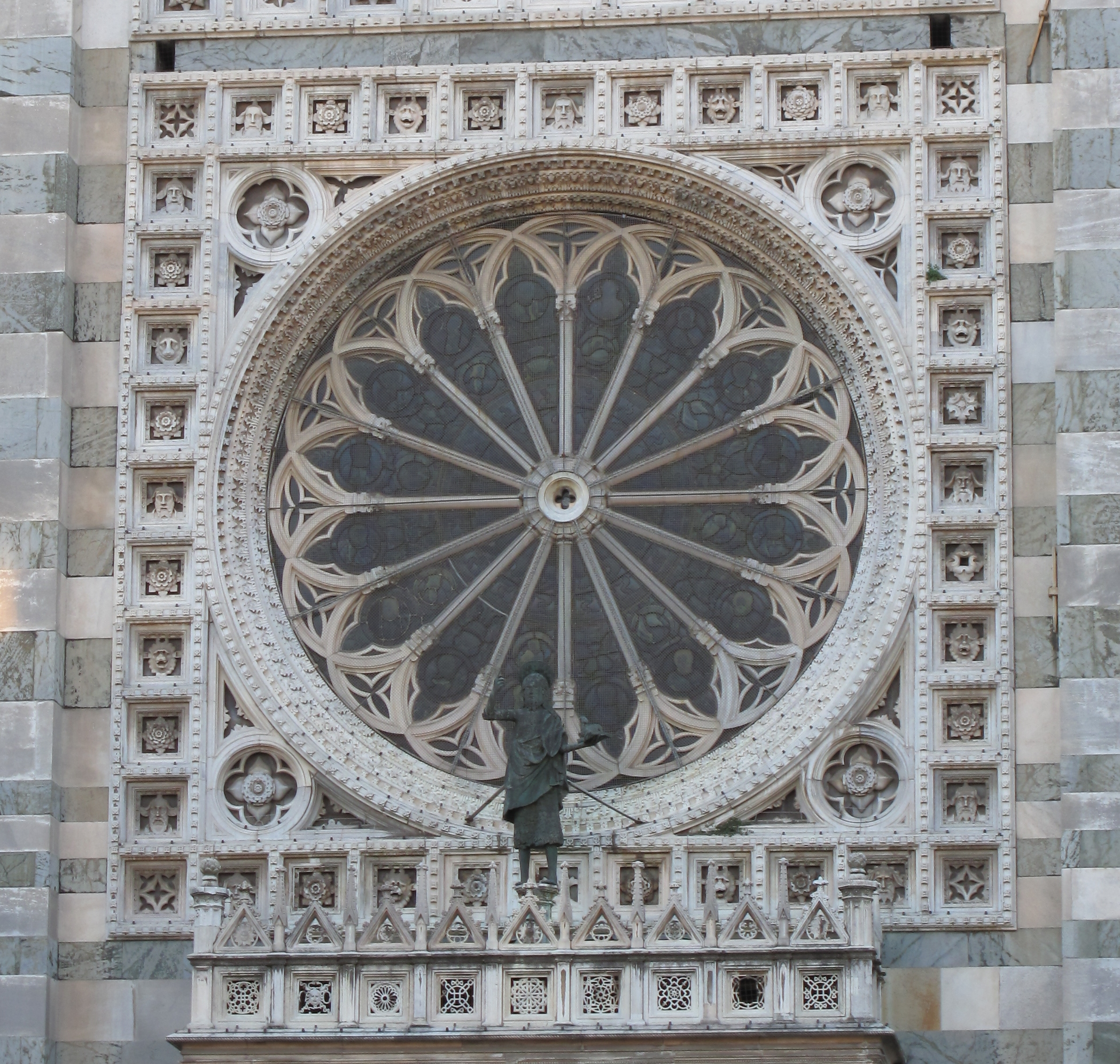
The rose window

== Interior ==
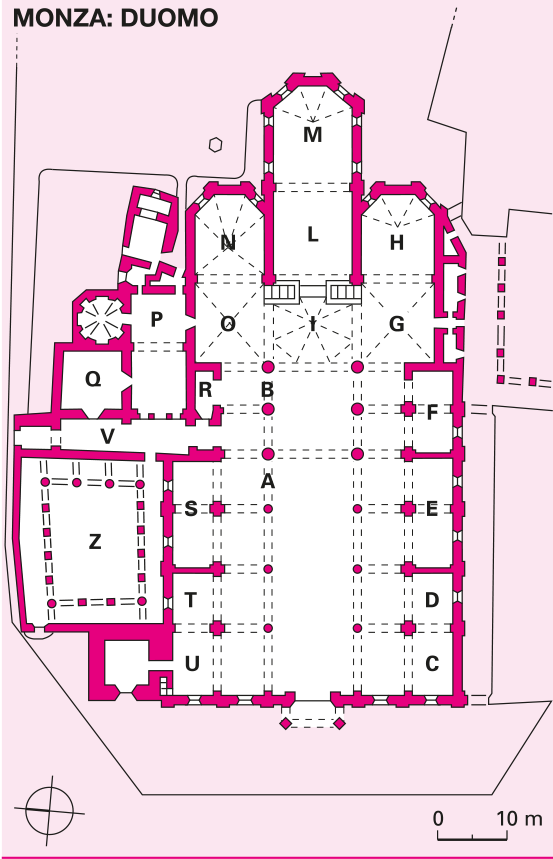
Plan of Monza Cathedral. Scale 0:10 m. (A) Wooden pulpit by Carlo Amati (1808), (B) Evangelical pulpit by Matteo da Campione, (C) Chapel of St Catherine, (D) Chapel of Saints Roch and Sebastian, (E) Chapel of the Beheading, (F) Chapel of St Anthony the Abbot, (G) Right transept, (H) Chapel of Our Lady of the Rosary, (L) Presbytery, (M) Apse, (N) Chapel of Theodolinda, (O) Left transept, (P) Large sacristy, (Q) Small sacristy, (R) Chapel of St Stephen, (S) Chapel of the Corpus Domini, (T) Chapel of St Lucy, (U) Baptistery chapel, (V) Small courtyard, (Z) Little cemetery

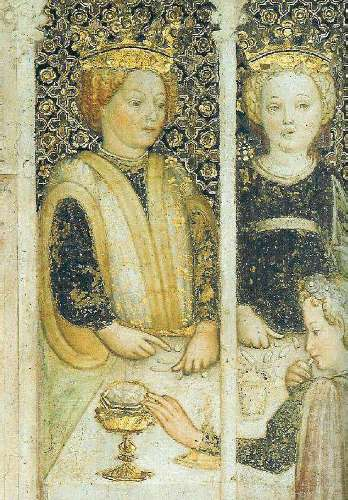
Frescoes in the Theodelinda Chapel

The church has a nave and two aisles, separated by octagonal columns with Romanesque capitals and round columns with Baroque capitals. It ends in large apses, and has a series of chapels opening into the aisles.

The wall decoration is overwhelmingly Baroque. Other artworks include a choir by Matteo da Campione, the high altar by Andrea Appiani, and the presbytery and transept frescoes by Giuseppe Meda and Giuseppe Arcimboldi.

=== Transects ===
In a late Mannerist climate we are transported to the decorations of the internal heads of the transepts, starting with the southern one (Albero di Jesse, by Giuseppe Arcimboldi and Giuseppe Meda, 1558) to move on to the northern one (Stories of San Giovanni Battista, by G. Meda and Giovan Battista Fiammenghino, 1580).

=== Organs ===
Inserted in the case in Cornu Evangeli, it is a large 12-foot instrument in the Italian Renaissance style but recently made, by the Italian firm Gustavo Zanin. Equipped with 17 stops and a single 54-note keyboard and an 18-note lectern pedal board. Placed in the old case in Cornu Epistolæ is the opus 617 from the prestigious Swiss organ manufacturer Metzler Orgelbau with fully mechanical transmission, with 29 stops distributed in the two manuals and pedal. It was built in 2002.

=== Presbytery ===
The decoration of the presbytery and choir is the greatest pictorial achievement of the seventeenth century and sees Stefano Danedi known as Montalto, Isidoro Bianchi, Carlo Cane and Ercole Procaccini the Younger at work, with quadrature by Francesco Villa. The vault of the main nave was instead frescoed at the end of the century by Stefano Maria Legnani known as Legnanino, with squares by Castellino (1693).

=== Nave paintings ===
The ten paintings in the central nave with Stories of Theodolinda and the Iron Crown, made between the 17th and 18th centuries, belong to various painters, including Sebastiano Ricci, Filippo Abbiati and Andrea Porta.

=== Chapels ===
However, it is above all the eighteenth century that marks the interior of the building, which constitutes a privileged observatory for the study of Lombard figurative culture between Baroque, Baroque and Rococo. Pietro Gilardi frescoes the lantern with Stories of the Cross (1718–19); Giovan Angelo Borroni paints in the chapel of the Rosary (1719–21), in that of the Baptistery and in that of Santa Lucia (1752–53); Mattia Bortoloni decorates the Corpus Domini chapel (1742). The final episode consists of the intervention in the cathedral by Carlo Innocenzo Carloni, the great master of international rococo, already active in Austria, Germany and Bohemia. Between 1738 and 1740, according to a program established by the Jesuit Bernardino Capriate, he decorated the vaults of the aisles, the triumphal arch and the western walls of the transept.

=== Treasury ===
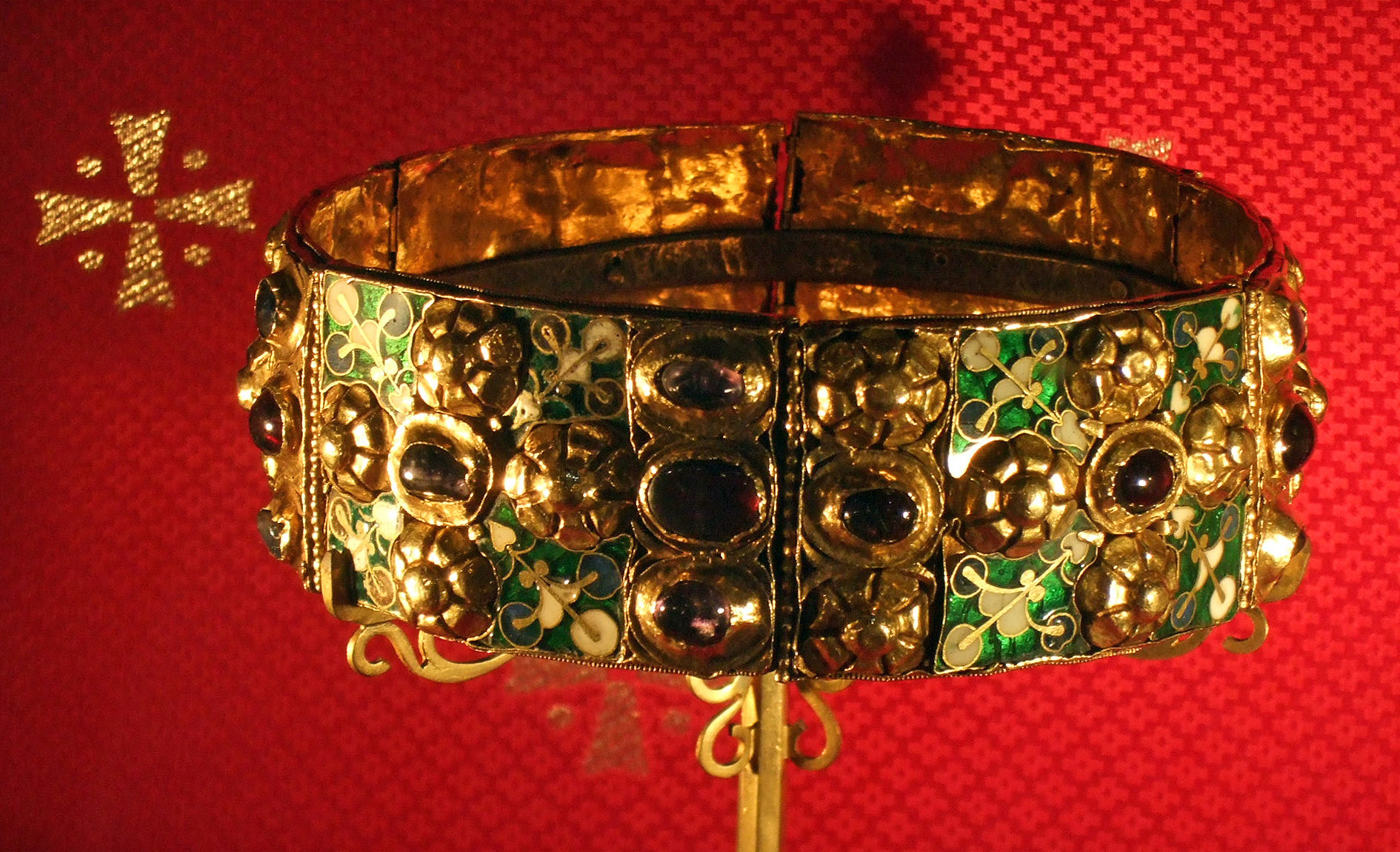
The Iron Crown in the Theodelinda Chapel

In the right transept is the entrance to the Serpero Museum which houses the treasury with the Iron Crown of Lombardy, and the Late Antique ivory Poet and Muse diptych, of about 500, as well as an internationally important collection of late antique and early medieval works of various kinds, many deposited by Theodelinda herself. These include small metal 6th century ampullae from the Holy Land which are evidence of the emerging iconography of medieval art, among them the earliest depictions of the treatments of the Crucifixion and Nativity of Jesus in art that were to become standard throughout the Middle Ages and beyond. Only Bobbio has an equivalent collection of ampullae. The library holds a number of old and important illuminated manuscripts.

== Theodelinda Chapel ==
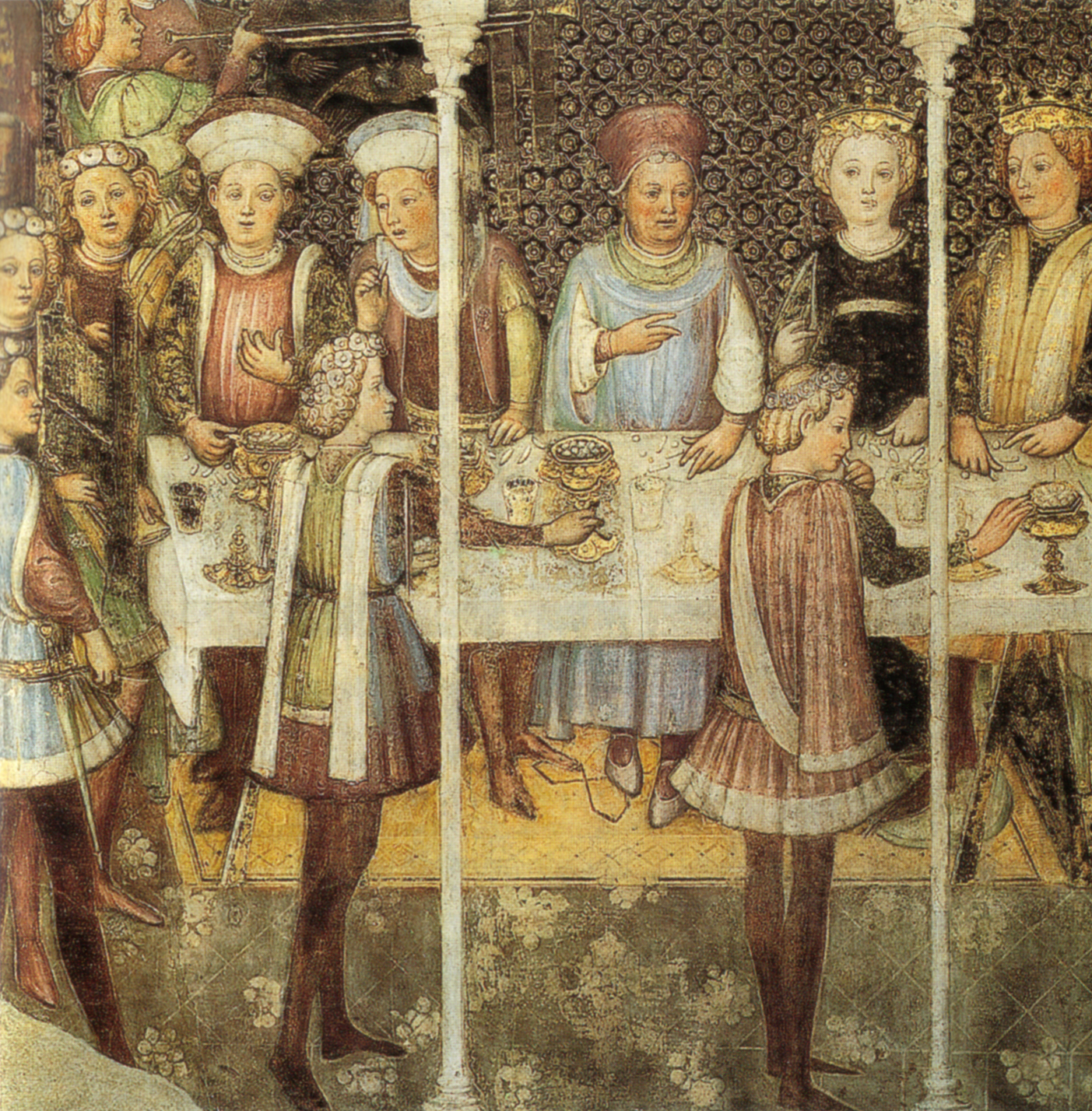
Frescos in the Theodelinda Chapel

Apart from the Iron Crown, the most famous attraction of the church is the Chapel of Theodelinda. It has 15th-century frescoes from the Zavattari workshop depicting stories of the queen's life, such as the dove episode, her marriage proposal, her meeting with her first husband, Authari, the latter's death in battle, and her new marriage with Agilulf. All the figures are portrayed with rich garments typical of the Visconti era.

The vault is decorated with 14th-century figures of saints and evangelists enthroned. On othe outer arch are depicted Theodelinda with her court venerating Saint John the Baptist.

== Alabardieri guard ==
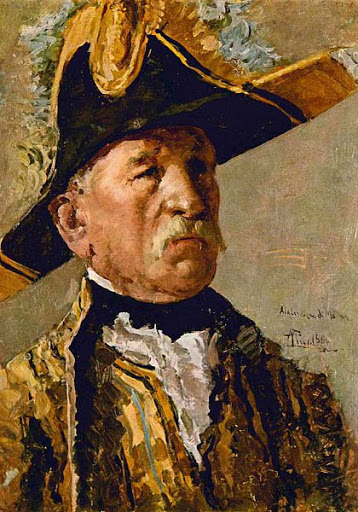
Pompeo Mariani, Alabardiere guard

An ancient and unusual privilege of the Duomo is its right to employ ceremonial armed guards, along the lines of the Papal Swiss Guard at the Vatican. Known as Alabardieri from the halberds they carry, the date of their institution is described in a 1763 edict of Maria Theresa of Austria as ‘immemorial’. Their 18th-century style uniform, of blue wool with gold braiding and a belt buckle with an image of the Iron Crown, is unchanged from that approved in the edict, except that since the Napoleonic period the bicorne hat has replaced the earlier tricorne.

== The Bells ==
The bell tower is home to a concert of 8 bells in diatonic scale major of La. The bells were fused in 1741 by the Milanese Bartolomeo Bozzi, who also created the bells of the Basilica di Sant'Ambrogio. The bell tower has the characteristic of using a bell sound system known as "swing" (in Italian "slancio"), an exception in the Diocese of Milan, which instead uses the system "Ambrosian".

Bell	Musical note	Melter	Year	Average weight
One	La_{3}	Bartolomeo Bozzi	1741	372 kg
Two	Sol♯_{3}	Bartolomeo Bozzi	1741	414 kg
Three	Fa♯_{3}	Bartolomeo Bozzi	1741	662 kg
Four	Mi_{3}	Bartolomeo Bozzi	1741	993 kg
Five	Re_{3}	Bartolomeo Bozzi	1741	1324 kg
Six	Do♯_{3}	Bartolomeo Bozzi	1741	1656 kg
Seven	Si_{2}	Bartolomeo Bozzi	1741	2401 kg
Eight	La_{2}	Bartolomeo Bozzi	1741	3315 kg

== Burials ==
- Caterina Visconti
