= Poet and Muse diptych =

Roman ivory diptych

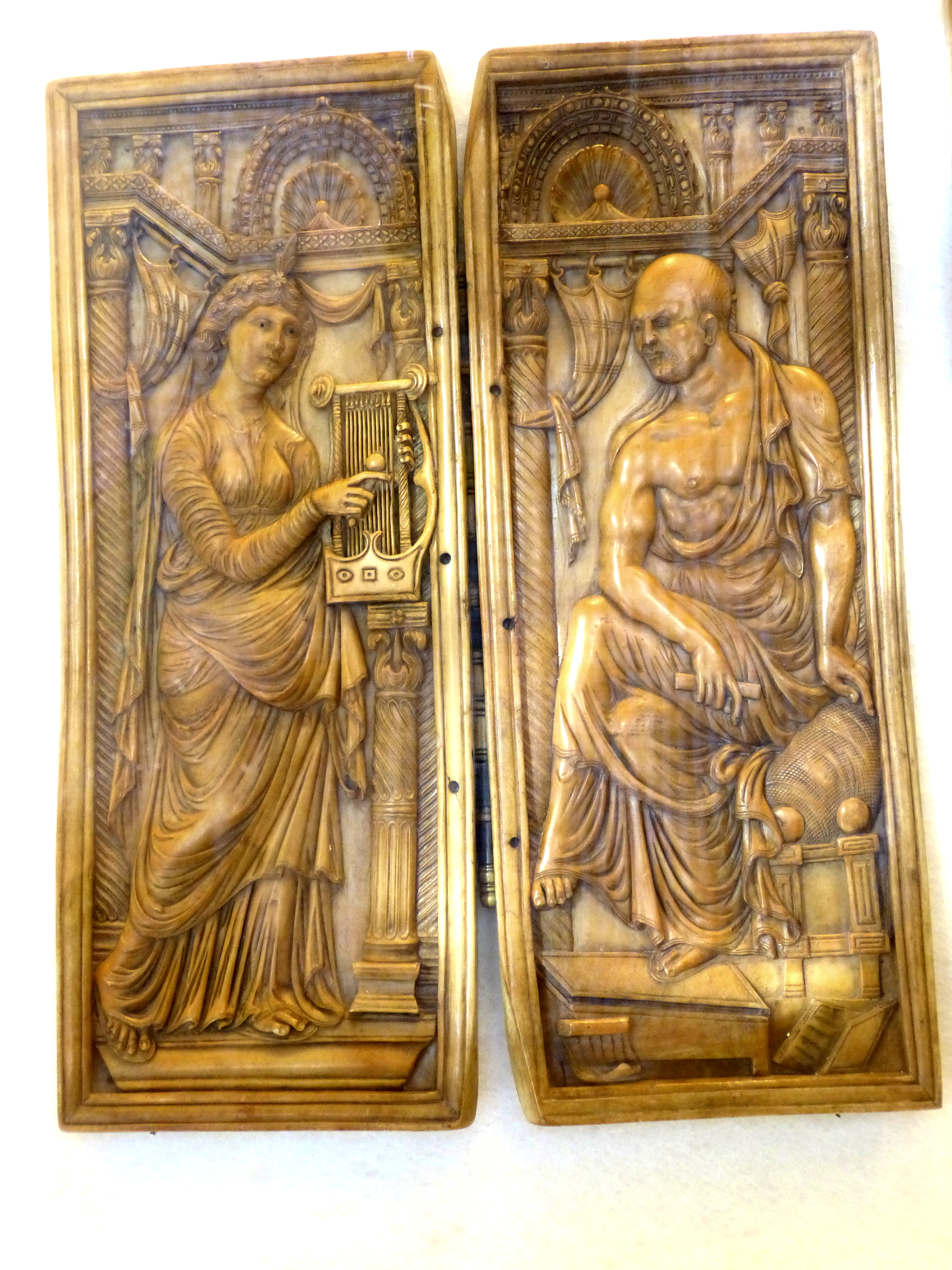
Poet and Muse diptych

The Poet and Muse diptych is a Late Antique ivory diptych that appears to commemorate, and to flatter, the literary pursuits of the aristocrat who commissioned it, so that it stands somewhat apart from the consular diptychs that were carved for distribution to friends and patrons when a man assumed the consular dignity during the later Roman Empire. The original inscription in this example, unusually, will have been carried out on the borders of the reverse side, which was infilled with a layer of wax for writing on, the ivory diptych being a very grand example of a wax tablet; the inscription has not survived, so there can be no way to identify the writer for whom it was made. In the literature that has accumulated about this diptych, various prominent figures have been offered as candidates: Ausonius, Boethius, and Claudian, and even earlier figures, like Ennius and Seneca, with whom the donor wished to be associated

The muse represented is Erato, muse of lyric poetry, with her usual attribute, the cithara, which she rests upon an ornately fluted column. The poet on the facing panel is seated, roused from his contemplation by the inspiring presence of his Muse. His writings, a scroll and writing tablets or small codices, lie scattered at his feet. His face is carefully characterized as a portrait, a man of middle age, balding, his features furrowed in thought. The classicizing realism and the iconographic situation, and the complete absence of any Christian symbolism whatsoever — Christian authors write under the inspiration of angels — combine to suggest a man who has been schooled in the pagan tradition, which no longer led to the traditional public cursus honorum, however, by the 5th century, and would instead have implied a man who was living secluded from public life, which had become resolutely Christian. W.F. Volbach characterized this as a "private" diptych, with the implication of a limited public, perhaps even retained by its patron; Delbrueck held it apart from the consular diptychs he published and published it separately, noting that it was difficult to ascertain the purpose and occasion for its facture.

The diptych is conserved in the Treasury of the Duomo of Monza, near Milan.
