= Iron Crown =

Italian reliquary

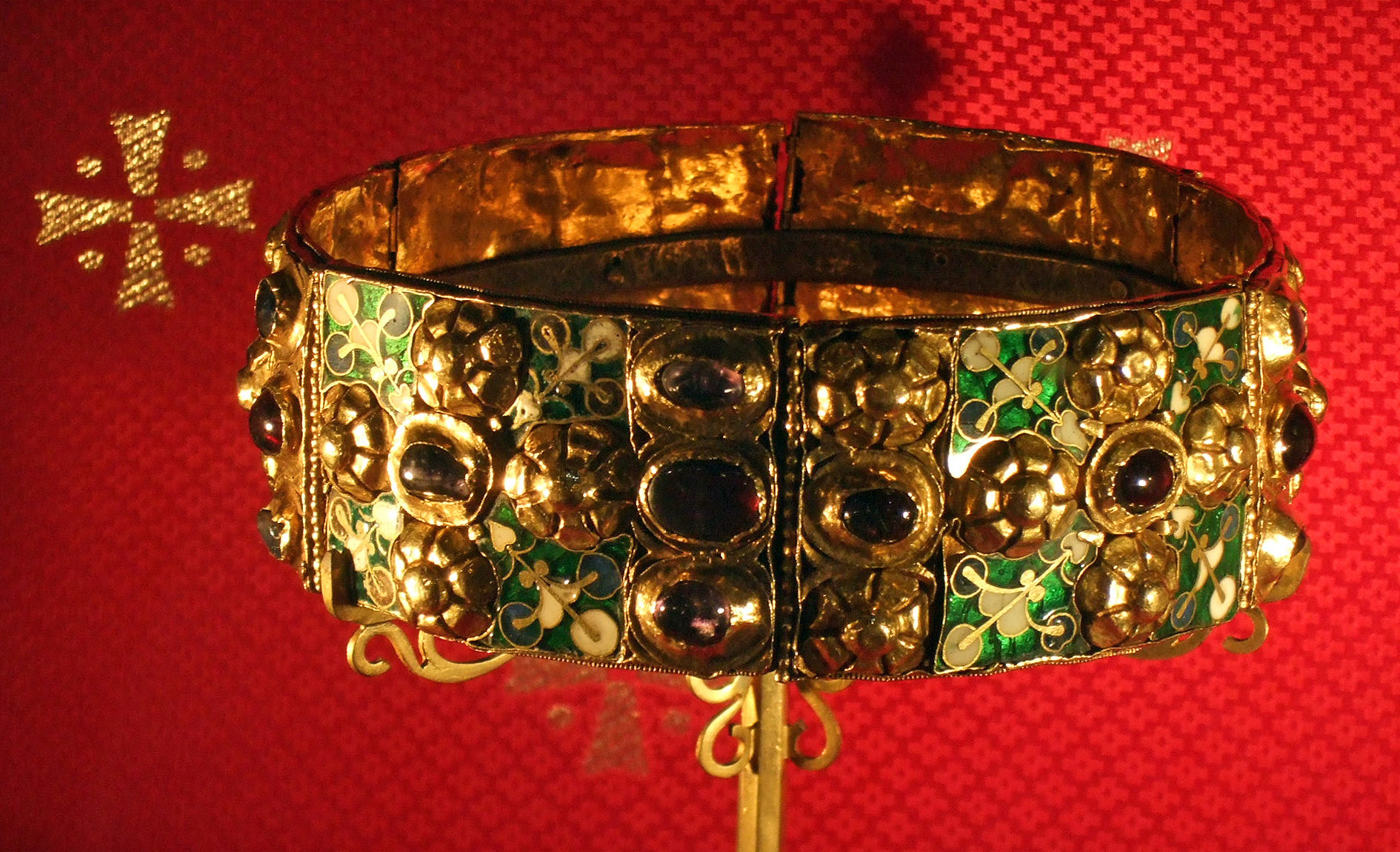
- The Iron Crown, preserved in the Cathedral of Monza, Italy

Heraldic depictions

Details
- Country: Kingdom of Italy (Frankish); Holy Roman Empire; Kingdom of Italy (Napoleonic); Kingdom of Lombardy–Venetia; Kingdom of Italy
- Made: c. 4th–5th and 9th century
- Owner: Cathedral of Monza
- Weight: ca. 605 grams
- Arches: None (circlet)
- Material: Gold
- Cap: None
- Notable stones: Garnets, sapphires and glass
- Other elements: Nail purportedly used at the Crucifixion of Jesus

The Iron Crown (in Italian, Latin, and Lombard: Corona Ferrea; German: Eiserne Krone) is a reliquary votive crown, traditionally considered one of the oldest royal insignia of Christendom. It was made in the Middle Ages, consisting of a circlet of gold and jewels fitted around a central silver band, which tradition held to be made of iron beaten out of a nail of the True Cross. In the later Middle Ages, the crown was used as regalia for the coronation of some Holy Roman Emperors as kings of Italy. It is kept in the Duomo of Monza.

== Description ==
The Iron Crown is so called because it contains a 1-centimetre-wide (0.39 in) band within it that is said to have been beaten out of a nail used at the crucifixion of Jesus. The outer circlet of the crown is made of six segments of beaten gold, partly enamelled, joined by hinges. It is set with 22 gemstones (Note: Seven red garnets, seven blue sapphires, four violet amethysts, and four green glass pastes) that stand out in relief, in the form of crosses and flowers. Its small size and hinged construction have suggested to some that it was originally a large armlet or, most probably, a votive crown. According to early modern scholars such as Bartolomeo Zucchi and Ludovico Antonio Muratori, the small size is due to a readjustment after the loss of two segments.

== Legend ==
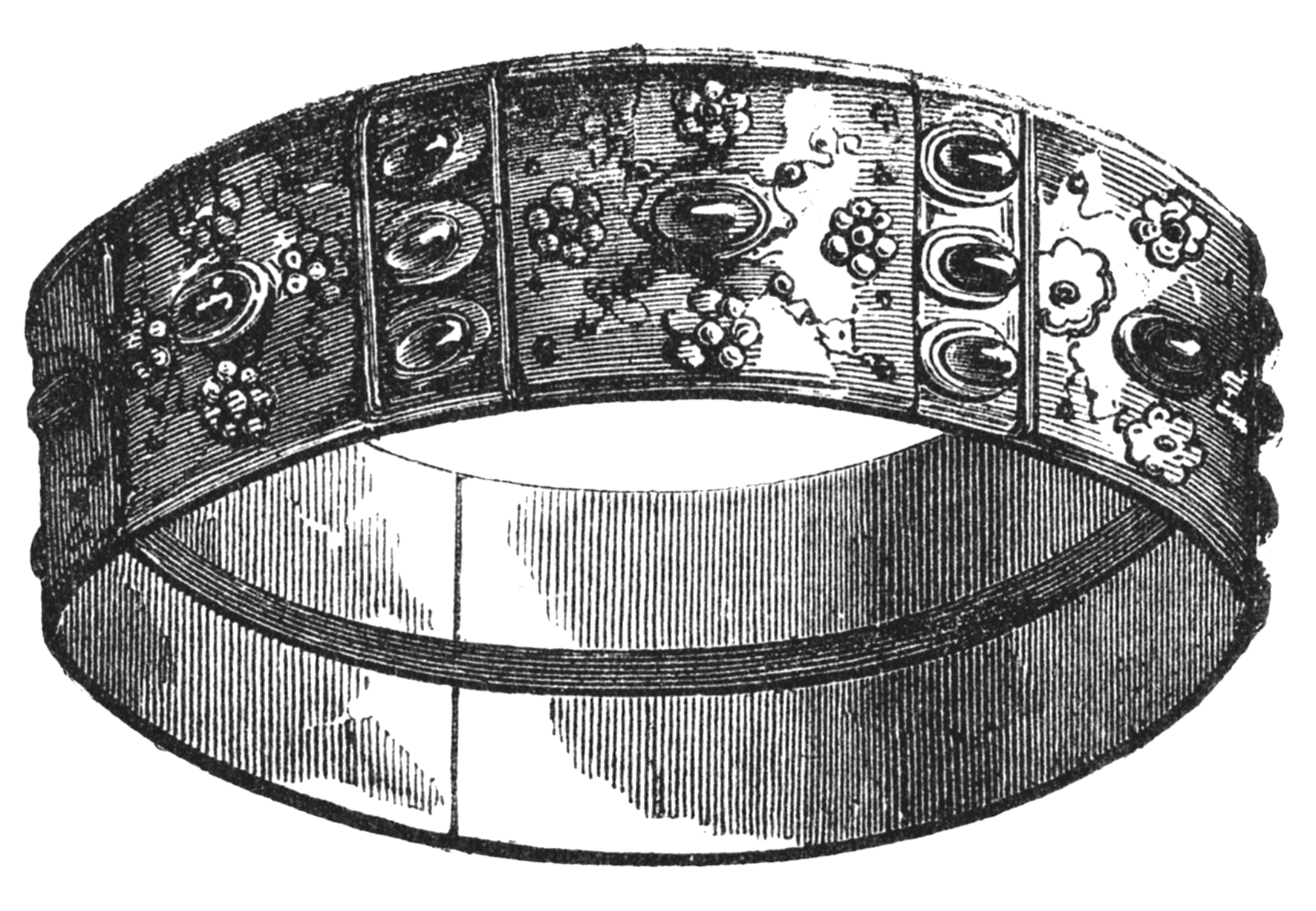
Drawing of the Iron Crown in 1858

According to tradition, St. Helena, mother of Constantine the Great, had the crown forged for her son around a beaten nail from the True Cross, which she had discovered. Pope Gregory the Great passed this crown to Theodelinda, princess of the Lombards, as a diplomatic gift, although he made no mention of it among his recorded donations. Theodelinda donated the crown to the church at Monza (where it is currently preserved in the cathedral) in 628.

According to another tradition reported by the historian Valeriana Maspero, the helm and the bit of Constantine were brought to Milan by the emperor Theodosius I, who resided there, and were exposed at his funeral, as described by Ambrose in his funeral oration De obitu Theodosii. Then, as the bit remained in Milan, the helm with the diadem was transferred to Constantinople, until Theoderic the Great, who had previously threatened Constantinople itself, claimed it as part of his right as the king of Italy. The Byzantines then sent him the diadem, holding the helmet (which was exposed in the cathedral of Hagia Sophia) until it was looted and lost following the sack of Constantinople in the Fourth Crusade in 1204. King Theoderic then adopted the diadem gemmis insignitum, quas pretiosior ferro innexa(s)crucis redemptoris divinae gemma connecteretas (Ambrose, De obitu Theodosii) as his crown. This is the Iron Crown, passed by the Goths to the Lombards when they invaded Italy.

The crown was used in Charlemagne's coronation as King of the Lombards in 774.

== History ==
=== Origins and early modifications ===
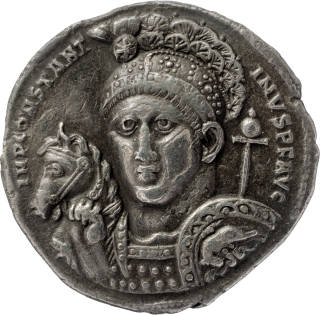
Medallion of Constantine I wearing a gemmed helmet

Scholarly research has long debated the origin of the Iron Crown, in the absence of contemporary sources attesting to its initial production or ceremonial use. Radiocarbon analysis performed in the late 20th century has identified at least two distinct chronological phases in its construction: the oldest components, including organic materials used to set the gemstones, date between the 5th and 6th centuries, while others belong to a period between the late 7th and 10th centuries.

The form and ornamentation of the gold plates are consistent with late Roman and Byzantine craftsmanship. Some scholars suggest that the crown originally formed part of a ceremonial helmet or diadem similar to those depicted in imperial portraits of Constantine I. It may have been among the regalia sent by Odoacer to Constantinople in 476 and subsequently returned to Theodoric the Great by Emperor Anastasius I Dicorus in 497, as recorded in the Anonymus Valesianus.

A further phase of modification is attributed to the Carolingian period. Some theories suggest the crown originally functioned as part of a gemmed helmet, consistent with depictions of rulers from Otto I to Frederick Barbarossa. Other interpretations propose that it was resized under Charlemagne for the coronation of his son Pepin of Italy in 781.

An alternative theory posits that the crown was originally conceived as a relic containing a nail of the True Cross and preserved in the Basilica of Sant'Ambrogio in Milan until the late 10th century, when it was transferred to Monza Cathedral under the archbishopric of Aribert of Intimiano.

=== Coronations and medieval use ===
The Iron Crown was never used by the Lombard rulers who, like other Germanic monarchs, were not enthroned through a crown—which they did not use—but were instead acclaimed by the people in arms, and the symbol of royal power was the hasta regia, the sovereign’s spear. Although 17th-century historiography attributed up to 34 coronations to the Iron Crown, critical scholarship identifies only a limited number as historically reliable. The first confirmed coronation is that of Otto III in 996 at Pavia, followed by Conrad II in 1026, and later Frederick Barbarossa was crowned in 1155 at the Basilica of San Michele Maggiore in Pavia.

By the 14th century, the crown was certainly in ceremonial use. In 1310, when Henry VII of Luxembourg arrived in Milan, the Iron Crown was not available due to political circumstances, and a new silver crown was created for the occasion. It was only in 1319 that the original crown was returned to Monza.

Confirmed later uses include the coronation of Charles IV in 1355, Sigismund in 1433, and Charles V in 1530 in Bologna, in the last coronation performed by a pope. These events marked the crown's continued importance in legitimizing imperial authority in Italy.

=== Napoleonic Era and the Order of the Iron Crown ===
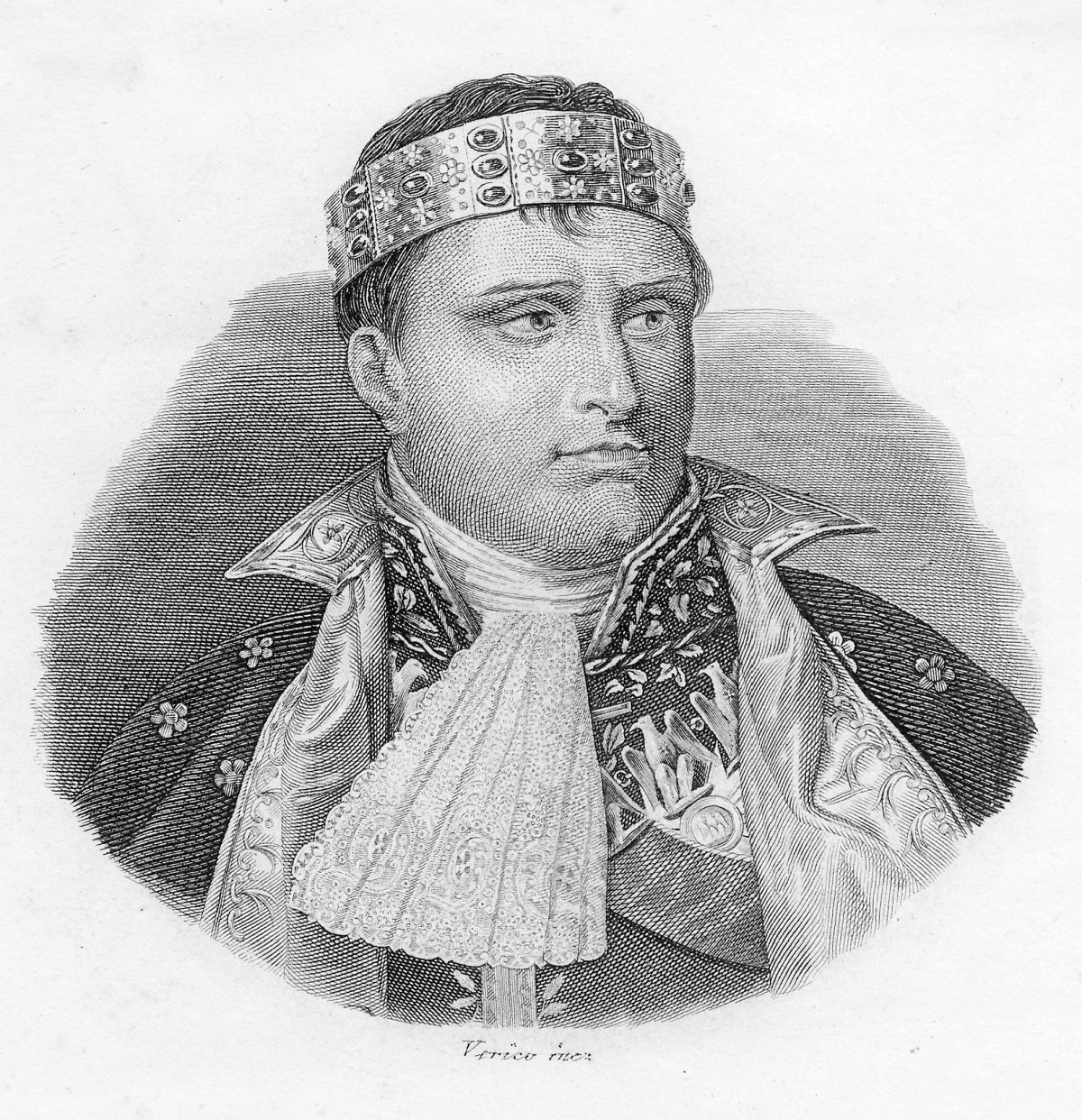
Napoleon wearing the Iron Crown

On 26 May 1805, Napoleon Bonaparte crowned himself King of Italy at the Milan Cathedral. During the ceremony, he took the Iron Crown, placed it on his head, and pronounced the formula: Dio me l'ha data, guai a chi la tocca ("God has given it to me, woe to him who touches it").

On 15 June 1805, Napoleon founded the Order of the Iron Crown as a dynastic order of merit. After the fall of the Napoleonic Kingdom of Italy, the order was abolished in 1814 but later reestablished by Emperor Francis I of Austria in 1816 under Austrian rule.

=== Habsburg use and the Kingdom of Lombardy–Venetia ===
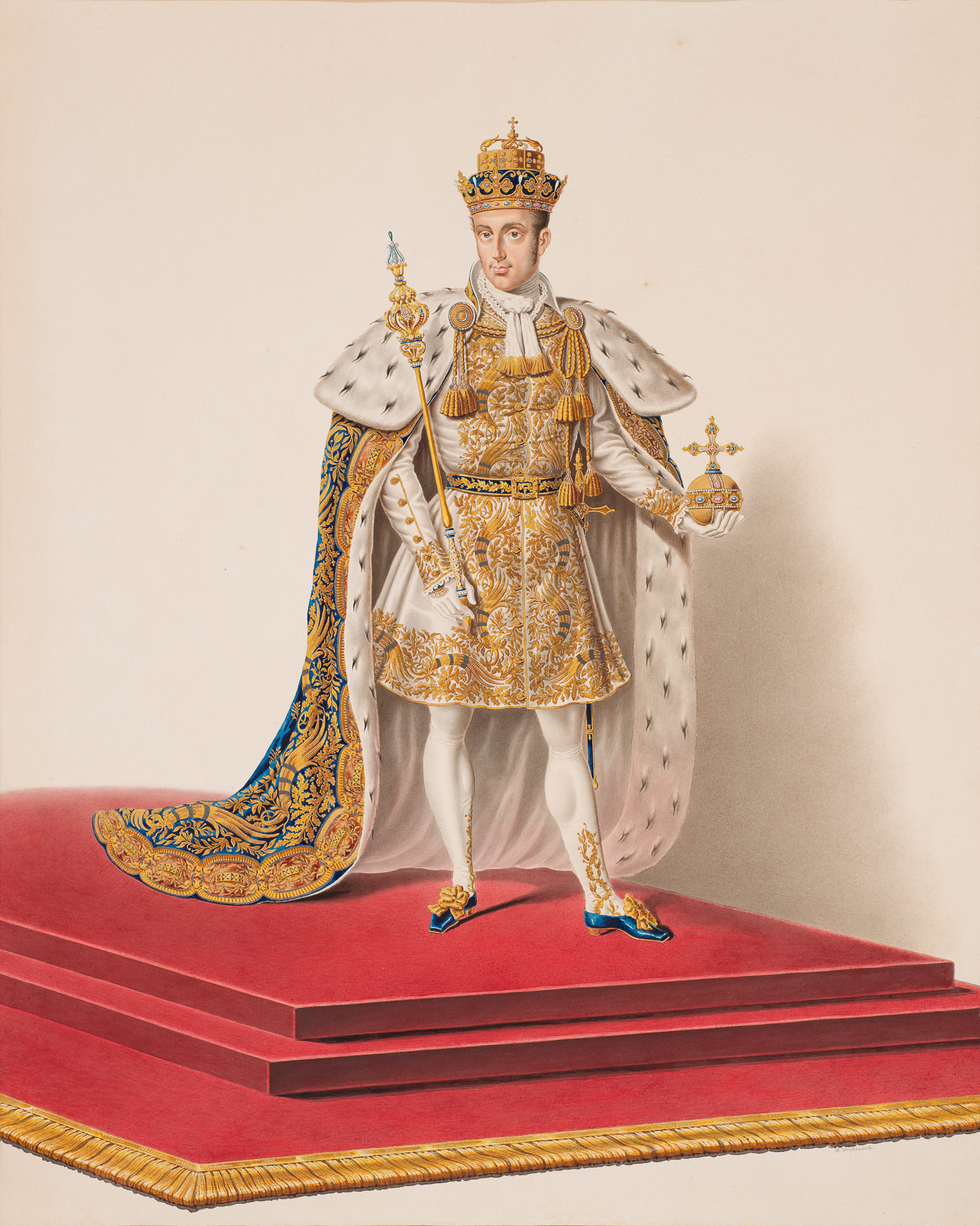
Ferdinand I crowned King of Lombardy–Venetia, 1838

Under the Congress of Vienna, the territories of northern Italy became the Kingdom of Lombardy–Venetia under Habsburg control. The Iron Crown was adopted as the royal insignia of this kingdom. The only Habsburg monarch formally crowned with it was Ferdinand I of Austria, in a ceremony held on 6 September 1838 in Milan. The event followed an elaborate ceremonial protocol and reaffirmed the symbolic continuity of the crown under Austrian sovereignty.

In the wake of the Second Italian War of Independence, the crown was transferred to Vienna for safekeeping. It was returned to Italy only in 1866, following the Third Italian War of Independence and the cession of Veneto to the Kingdom of Italy.

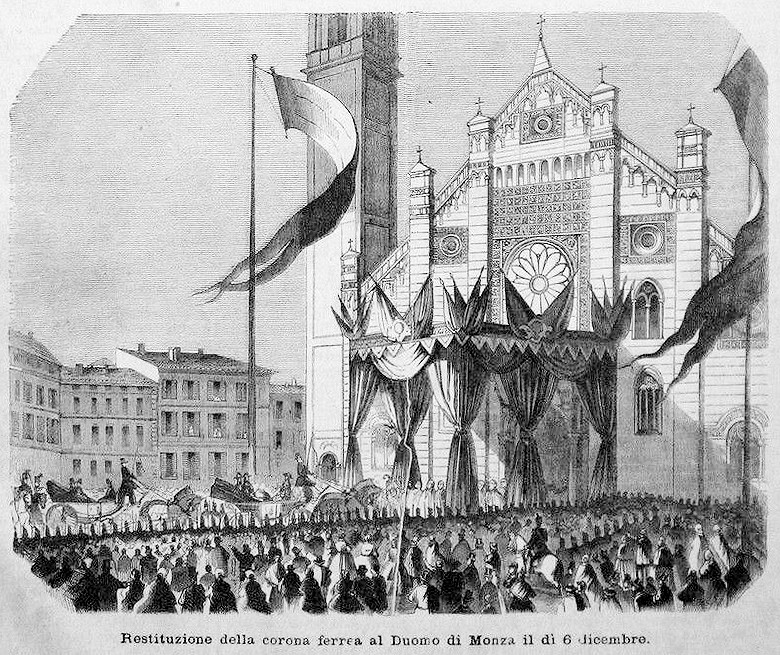
Return of the Iron Crown to Monza, 6 December 1866

Coat of arms of the Kingdom of Italy with the Iron Crown represented.

=== Return to Italy and modern era ===
On 4 November 1866, the Iron Crown was formally handed over to General Luigi Federico Menabrea by Austrian officials in Turin. It was transferred to the Royal Villa of Monza and, the next day, restored to the Monza Cathedral. From that point onward, the crown ceased to be used in coronations but retained symbolic importance in the newly unified Kingdom of Italy.

During the funerals of Victor Emmanuel II in 1878 and Umberto I in 1900, the crown was displayed ceremonially on the coffin. In 1890 it was officially included in the coat of arms of the Kingdom of Italy by royal decree.

During both World War I and World War II, the crown was removed from Monza and kept in safe locations — in 1918 in Rome, and in 1943 in the Vatican, under the protection of Cardinal Alfredo Ildefonso Schuster.

=== Contemporary status ===
Today, the Iron Crown is permanently housed in the Chapel of Theodelinda within Monza Cathedral. It is regarded as one of the most important surviving pieces of regalia of early medieval Europe. The crown is periodically studied and preserved under the oversight of the Italian Ministry of Culture, and has been the subject of metallurgical and archaeological investigation.

In 2023, the crown was included in a national heritage protection program for medieval artifacts of exceptional cultural value.

=== Coronation rite for the kings of Italy ===
From the 9th century to the dissolution of the Holy Roman Empire in the early 19th century, most kings of Italy were also emperors-elect of the Holy Roman Empire. The Italian coronation represented a crucial stage in the so-called Iter Italicum, the ceremonial journey that Roman-Germanic kings undertook to reach Rome for imperial coronation. On the way, they would traditionally stop in Lombardy to receive the Iron Crown as a symbol of their authority over the Kingdom of Italy.

The earliest traditional site of coronation was Pavia, the former Lombard capital, particularly in the Basilica of San Michele Maggiore, which became closely associated with royal authority during the Ottonian period. From the early 11th century, particularly after the coronation of Conrad II in 1026, Milan also became an official coronation site, reflecting its growing political and ecclesiastical significance.

The coronation rite used in Milan had both Roman and Frankish elements and was preserved in medieval pontificals and sacramentaries. According to liturgical sources and eyewitness descriptions, the king was invested with several regalia in a specific order: the sword of state, the sceptre, the virge, the orb, and finally the Iron Crown. The crowning itself was accompanied by the formula Accipe coronam regni ("Receive the crown of the kingdom"), followed by the prayer Deus perpetuitatis ("O God of perpetuity").

Although there was no strict uniformity, some Milanese rites also included the anointing of the king with holy oil, usually on the chest and head, a custom that paralleled practices in imperial and royal coronations elsewhere in Europe. The archbishop of Milan, as metropolitan and principal consecrator, officiated the ceremony, which could take place in different churches depending on political circumstances: among them, Monza Cathedral, Milan Cathedral, or the Basilica of San Michele in Pavia.

The Iron Crown functioned not only as a legitimizing object but also as a relic, due to the belief that the inner band of metal was forged from one of the nails of the Crucifixion. This dual function — both political and sacral — gave the crown a unique status among European regalia and contributed to its continued use and veneration until the 19th century.

The most elaborate example of the coronation rite remains that of Henry VII at Milan in 1311 or 1312, considered by some historians the liturgical prototype of later Milanese coronations. In that occasion, detailed descriptions indicate the complete sequence of regalia bestowal, liturgical texts, and ceremonial procession.

After the 16th century, the ritual use of the Iron Crown became more episodic and politically symbolic. Notably, Napoleon Bonaparte adopted the coronation formula during his self-coronation as King of Italy in 1805, reviving the medieval gesture of crowning himself with the Iron Crown and declaring, in Italian: Dio me l’ha data, guai a chi la tocca ("God gave it to me, woe to him who touches it").

== Scientific analysis ==
In 1993, the crown was subjected to extensive scientific analysis performed by the University of Milan using X-ray fluorescence (XRF) analysis and radiocarbon dating. The XRF analysis on the crown metal revealed that all the foils, rosettes and bezels were made with the same alloy, made of 84–85% gold, 5–7% silver, and 8–10% copper, suggesting a contemporary construction of the main part of the crown, while the fillets external to the enamel plates and the hinge pins were made of 90–91% gold and 9–10% silver, suggesting subsequent reworking.

Three of the 24 vitreous enamel plates are visually different from the others in colour and construction and were traditionally considered to be later restorations. The XRF analysis confirmed that they were made with a different technique, with their glass being made of potassium salt, while the others are made of sodium salt (sodium is not directly detectable by the XRF analysis).

Radiocarbon dating of fragments of beeswax used to fix the enamel plates to the gold foils of the crown showed that the wax under the "strange" plates was from around 500 AD, while the ones under the "normal" plates came from around 800 AD. This is consistent with the tradition of a more antique crown, further decorated during the reign of Theoderic (with the addition of the enamels), and then extensively restored during the reign of Charlemagne.

The crown was found to contain no iron, and that the supposed iron band was actually pure silver. A note from the Roman Ceremonial of 1159 provides that the Iron Crown is so called "quod laminam quondam habet in summitate", stating that the iron was once laid over the crown (probably as an arch, as in other crowns of the era), not into it. Speculations have been made that the silver circle was added by the goldsmith Antellotto Bracciforte, who restored the crown in 1345 to reinforce it given that the (presumed) theft of two plates had weakened the hinges. (Currently, in one of the crown's junctions, two of the plates are not joined by the hinge, which is too damaged, but are held only by the inner silver ring.) In 1352, for the first time, a document (the inventory of the treasury of the Cathedral of Monza) describes the crown as being small.

The gems in the crown are seven red garnets, seven blue corundums (sapphires), four violet amethysts, and four gems made of glass.

== Cultural references ==
A surprising image of the Iron Crown figures in Chapter 37 "Sunset" of Herman Melville's Moby-Dick. The brief chapter is devoted to Captain Ahab's soliloquy. Among his delusions of persecution and grandeur, he imagines himself crowned with the Iron Crown of Lombardy.

The Italian film La corona di ferro (1941), directed by Alessandro Blasetti, tells a story about the arrival of the crown in Italy.

In the Father Brown TV series, the crown figures in episode 70 (The Two Deaths of Hercule Flambeau).
