= 590s =

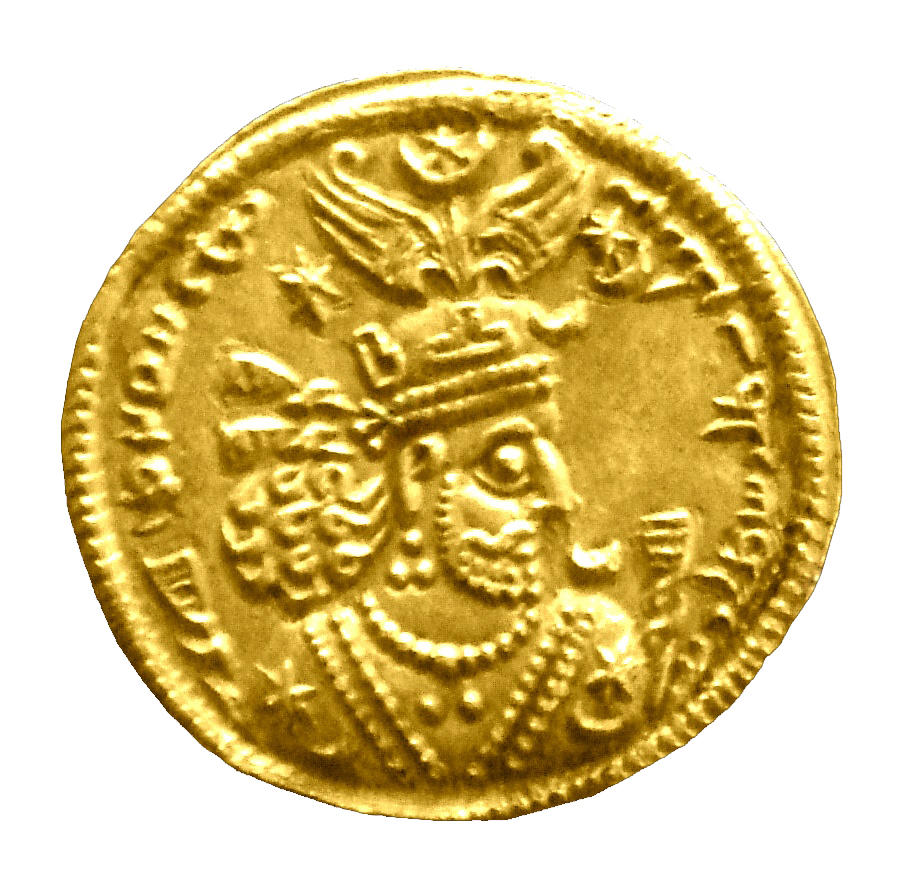
Gold coin with the image of Khosrau II

The 590s decade ran from January 1, 590, to December 31, 599.

== Events ==
=== 590 ===
==== By place ====
====== Byzantine Empire ======
- Byzantine–Sassanid War: Emperor Maurice defeats the Persian forces under Bahrām Chobin at Nisibis (modern Turkey), and drives them back into Armenia.
- Comentiolus, commander (magister militum) of the eastern army, receives the legitimate Persian king, Khosrau II, as a refugee in his headquarters at Hierapolis.
- Maurice establishes the Exarchate of Carthage in Africa. He combines the civil authority of a praetorian prefect and the military authority, based at Carthage.
- March 26 – Theodosius, eldest son of Maurice, is proclaimed as co-emperor. He becomes his father's heir to the Byzantine throne.
- Stephen I succeeds his father Guaram I as king of Iberia (Georgia) (approximate date).

====== Europe ======
- The Franks and Burgundians under King Guntram invade Italy. They capture the cities Milan and Verona, but are forced to leave by a plague outbreak in the Po Valley.
- The Franks again invade Italy; they capture Modena and Mantua. Several Lombard dukes defect: Gisulf I, duke of Friuli, is defeated and replaced by his son Gisulf II.
- September 5 – King Authari dies (possibly by poison) after a six-year reign, and is succeeded by Agilulf, duke (dux) of Turin, who marries his widow Theodelinda.
- Frankish rebellion led by Basina, daughter of Chilperic I.

====== Britain ======
- Æthelberht succeeds his father Eormenric as king (bretwalda) of Kent (according to the Anglo-Saxon Chronicle).
- Siege of Lindisfarne: A Brythonic coalition lays siege to King Hussa of Bernicia at Lindisfarne Castle (Holy Island).
- Owain mab Urien succeeds his father Urien, as Brythonic king of Rheged in Northern England (approximate date).

====== Persia ======
- Spring – King Hormizd IV dismisses Bahrām Chobin as commander (Eran spahbed). He revolts and marches with the support of the Persian army towards Ctesiphon.
- February 15 – Hormizd IV is deposed and assassinated by Persian nobles. Having ruled since 579, he is succeeded by his son Khosrau II as king of the Persian Empire.
- September – Bahrām Chobin defeats the inferior forces of Khosrau II near Ctesiphon. He seizes the throne and proclaims himself as king Bahrām IV of Persia.

====== Asia ======
- Kadungon becomes king of the Pandyan Kingdom in South India (approximate date).
- Yeongyang becomes ruler of the Korean kingdom of Goguryeo.

==== By topic ====
====== Religion ======
- February 7 – Pope Pelagius II falls victim to the plague that devastated Rome. After an 11-year reign he is succeeded by Gregory I, age 50, as the 64th pope, and the first from a monastic background.
- Egidius, bishop of Reims, is tried at Metz before a council of bishops for a conspiracy against King Childebert II; he is found guilty and exiled to Strasbourg.
- Gregory I begins a vigorous program of rebuilding aqueducts and restoring Rome. He feeds the citizens with doles of grain, as under Roman imperial rule.
- Columbanus, Irish missionary, obtains from King Guntram the Gallo-Roman castle Luxovium (Luxeuil-les-Bains), where he founds the Abbey of Luxeuil.
- John of Biclaro, Visigoth chronicler, finishes his "Chronicle" before he is appointed bishop of Girona (Catalonia, Spain).

=== 591 ===
==== By place ====
====== Byzantine Empire ======
- Byzantine–Sassanid War: Emperor Maurice, seeing an opportunity to end the prolonged war to the advantage of Constantinople, assists Khosrau II to regain the Persian throne. He sends a Byzantine army (35,000 men) under Narses into Mesopotamia, through Syria. At the same time, an expeditionary force in Armenia advances through Caucasian Iberia into Media (modern Azerbaijan).
- Battle of Blarathon: A Persian army of about 40,000 men under King Bahrām VI is defeated, in the lowlands near Ganzak (northwestern Iran), by the Byzantines. Bahrām flees to seek refuge with the Turks in Central Asia, and settles in Fergana. However, after some time, he is murdered by a hired assassin of Khosrau II.
- Summer – Maurice begins a series of military expeditions, to defend the Balkan provinces from the Avars and Slavs. He establishes the Danube frontier (Limes Moesiae) from the Delta to the fortress city of Singidunum (Belgrade), and permits the Byzantines to reassert their authority in the interior.

====== Europe ======
- Agilulf, cousin of Authari (called "the Thuringian"), is raised on the shield (a ceremonial investment) by Lombard warriors in Milan. He becomes king of the Lombards, on advice of the Lombard dukes (dux). Agilulf marries widowed queen Theodelinda and is baptized to please her.
- Arechis I succeeds his uncle Zotto as the second Duke of Benevento.
- A locust swarm destroys the harvest in Northern Italy (approximate date).

====== Persia ======
- Khosrau II is reinstalled as king of the Persian Empire. Peace with Constantinople is concluded after a war of almost 20 years. Maurice receives the Persian provinces of Armenia and Georgia. The recognition of the traditional frontiers, and the cessation of subsidies for the Caucasus forts, leaves the Byzantines in a dominant position in their relations with Persia.

====== Asia ======
- The first city wall of Hangzhou (Eastern China) is constructed.

====== Mesoamerica ======
- May 21 – A Mesoamerican ballgame court is dedicated at the Mayan city of Chinkultic (Mexico).

==== By topic ====
====== Religion ======
- Pope Gregory I criticizes the bishops of Arles and Marseille for allowing the forced baptism of Jews in Provence (France).
- Jnanagupta, Afghan Buddhist monk, translates the Vimalakirti Sutra into Chinese.

=== 592 ===
==== By place ====
====== Byzantine Empire ======
- Emperor Maurice regains the Byzantine stronghold Singidunum (modern Belgrade) from the Avars. By counter-invading their homelands on the Balkans, Byzantine troops increase their pay by pillaging in hostile territory.

====== Europe ======
- January 28 – King Guntram, age 59, dies after a 31-year reign, and is succeeded by his nephew Childebert II, who becomes ruler of Burgundy. He is buried at Saint Marcellus of Chalons Church, in Chalon-sur-Saône (Eastern France).
- Ariulf becomes the second Duke of Spoleto (Central Italy).

====== Britain ======
- Battle of Woden's Burg: After the mass killing at Woden's Burg, near Marlborough (South West England), Ceawlin is deposed as king of the West Saxons. His son Cuthwine is taken prisoner and goes into exile.
- Ceol succeeds his uncle Ceawlin after his defeat at Woden's Burg. He becomes king of Wessex (according to the Anglo-Saxon Chronicle).

====== Asia ======
- Summer – Emperor Wéndi reduces taxes, due to an overflowing abundance of food and silk in the governmental stores. He sends messengers around central China, redistributing land to give the poor farming land.
- December 8 – Emperor Sushun of Japan is murdered after 5 years on the throne by agents of his rival Umako Soga, who is jealous of the emperor's power. He is succeeded by Suiko, widow of the late emperor Bidatsu.
- Winter – Empress Suiko moves the imperial capital of Japan to Asuka-Toyura Palace (Nara Prefecture) during the Asuka period.

==== By topic ====
====== Literature ======
- Gregory, bishop of Tours, completes his Historia Francorum ("History of the Franks").

=== 593 ===
==== By place ====
====== Byzantine Empire ======
- Spring – Priscus, commander-in-chief in Thrace, defeats the Slavic tribes and Gepids on Byzantine territory south of the Danube. He crosses the river to fight in the uncharted swamps and forests of modern-day Wallachia.
- Autumn – Emperor Maurice orders Priscus to spend the winter with his troops on the northern Danube bank, but he disobeys the emperor's order and retreats to the port city of Odessus (Varna) on the Black Sea Coast.

====== Britain ======
- Æthelfrith of Northumbria succeeds Hussa as king of Bernicia (Scotland). His accession possibly involves dynastic rivalry and the exile of Hussa's relatives.
- Pybba succeeds his father Creoda as king of Mercia (approximate date).

====== Persia ======
- The Persian usurper Hormizd V (who rises temporarily to power) is defeated by King Khosrau II.

====== Asia ======
- Empress Suiko begins a long reign during a pivotal period, in which Buddhism influences the development and culture of Japan. She is the first female ruler and the first to receive official recognition from China.
- Suiko appoints her 21-year-old nephew Shōtoku as regent, with strongman Umako Soga. He holds shared power for nearly 30 years, creating the nation's first constitution (Seventeen-article constitution).

==== By topic ====
====== Art ======
- The Altar to Amitābha Buddha is made during the Sui dynasty. It is now kept at the Museum of Fine Arts, Boston.

====== Religion ======
- Anastasius I is restored as patriarch of Antioch, after Gregory dies.
- The Shitennō-ji monastery is founded at Osaka (Japan) by Shōtoku.

=== 594 ===
==== By place ====
====== Byzantine Empire ======
- Balkan Campaign: The Slavs invade the Byzantine provinces of Moesia and Macedonia again; during their pillaging the towns of Aquis, Scupi and Zaldapa in Dobruja are destroyed.
- Autumn – Emperor Maurice replaces general Priscus for disobeying orders. He installs his inexperienced brother Peter, as commander-in-chief in charge of the war against the Avars.

====== Asia ======
- Emperor Wéndi repairs and expands sections of the Great Wall in the north-west, which is undertaken by using forced labour. During the years, thousands of civilians are killed.
- Empress Suiko issues the "Flourishing Three Treasures Edict", officially recognizing the practice of Buddhism in Japan. She begins diplomatic relations with the Sui dynasty (China).

==== By topic ====
====== Religion ======
- Amos succeeds John IV as Orthodox Patriarch of Jerusalem.
- Approximate date – Pope Gregory I publishes his Dialogues.

=== 595 ===
==== By place ====
====== Byzantine Empire ======
- Balkan Campaign: A Byzantine relief force under Priscus marches up the Danube River along the southern bank to Novae (modern Bulgaria). The fortress city of Singidunum (Belgrade) is plundered by the Avars, and abandoned after the approach of the Byzantines. The Avars retreat and launch a raid against Dalmatia.

====== Europe ======
- October – King Childebert II dies; his mother Brunhilda attempts to rule Austrasia and Burgundy, as regent for her grandsons. He is succeeded by his two young sons, Theudebert II and Theuderic II.
- The Lombards sack the town of Terracina (Central Italy). After they conquer more cities, Terracina remains an important military stronghold of the Byzantine Empire.
- After the death of Euin, Gaidoald becomes the Duke of Trent (Northern Italy).

====== Britain ======
- King Dynod Bwr of the Pennines (Northern England) dies fighting off a Bernician invasion. His kingdom Hen Ogledd ("The Old North") is overrun, and his family flees to Powys (approximate date).

====== Asia ======
- Spring – Emperor Wéndi orders the confiscation and destruction of privately held weapons; he exempts the border provinces from this edict.
- Supratisthitavarman succeeds his father Susthitavarman, as king of the Varman dynasty in Assam (Northeast India).
- Construction begins on the Zhaozhou Bridge ("Safe crossing bridge") in Hebei Province, during the Sui dynasty (China).

==== By topic ====
====== Religion ======
- June – Pope Gregory I the Great sends a group of Benedictine monks under Augustine of Canterbury on a mission to Britain, to Christianize King Æthelberht, and convert the Kingdom of Kent from native Anglo-Saxon paganism. He carries letters of commendation to bishops, and is accompanied by Frankish interpreters.
- September 2 – John IV ("the Faster"), patriarch of Constantinople, dies after a 13-year reign in which he has mediated disputes between the Eastern Orthodox Church and the Monophysites.
- Muhammad, Islamic prophet, meets and marries Khadija. She is a 40-year-old widow and 15 years older than he. Supported by Khadija's wealth, they form a successful merchant partnership.

=== 596 ===
==== By place ====
====== Byzantine Empire ======
- Emperor Maurice uses the city of Marcianopolis (modern Bulgaria) as a military base of operations on the lower Danube River, against the Slavs on the Balkans.

====== Britain ======
- Battle of Raith: An invading force of Angles lands on the Fife coast near Raith (Kirkcaldy) and defeats an alliance of Scots, Britons and Picts, under King Áedán mac Gabráin of Dál Riata (Scotland).

====== Asia ======
- Emperor Wéndi sends diplomatic letters to the royal court of Goguryeo (Korea). He demands the cancellation of the military alliance with the Eastern Turk Khanate, and the raiding of Sui border regions.

==== By topic ====
====== Religion ======
- Gregorian Mission: Augustine of Canterbury lands with a group of missionaries on the Isle of Thanet (South East England). He is welcomed by King Æthelberht of Kent, who accepts baptism along with the rest of his court at the behest of his Christian Frankish wife, Bertha. Æthelbert assigns Augustine and his 40 monks a residence at Canterbury (Kent), where they found a Benedictine monastery that will make the town a centre of Christianity (or 597).

=== 597 ===
==== By place ====
====== Byzantine Empire ======
- Emperor Maurice writes his last will, in which he describes his ideas for governing the Byzantine Empire (his eldest son, Theodosius, will rule the East from Constantinople, and his second son, Tiberius, the West from Rome).
- Autumn – Balkan Campaign: The Avars, strengthened by the tribute of the Franks, resume their campaign along the Danube River, and besiege the Byzantine fortress city of Tomis (modern Romania) on the Black Sea coast.

====== Europe ======
- Queen Fredegund defeats her old rival Brunhilda of Austrasia, who supports the claims of her grandsons Theudebert II and Theuderic II to the Frankish throne, against those of Fredegund's son Chlothar II. She dies a few months later at Paris and is buried in the Basilica of Saint Denis.
- Chlothar II, age 13, becomes sole ruler of Neustria, and continues his mother's feud with Brunhilda. He is advised to prepare for war against Austrasia, the eastern part of the Frankish Kingdom.

====== Britain ======
- Ceolwulf succeeds his brother Ceol as king of Wessex. He becomes regent of Ceol's son Cynegils who is too young to inherit the throne.

====== Asia ======
- Mangalesha becomes king of the Chalukya dynasty, after his brother Kirtivarman I dies. He rules as regent of Kirtivarman's son Pulakeshin II, and invades the territory of Khandesh and Gujarat (northwestern India).

==== By topic ====
====== Religion ======
- Gregorian Mission: Augustine of Canterbury lands with a group of missionaries on the Isle of Thanet (South East England). He is welcomed by King Æthelberht of Kent, who accepts baptism (along with the rest of his court) at the behest of his Christian Frankish wife, Bertha. Æthelbert assigns Augustine and his 40 monks a residence at Canterbury, where they found a Benedictine monastery that will make the town a centre of Christianity (or 596).
- June 9 – Columba, Irish missionary, dies in Iona (Inner Hebrides) and is buried by his monks in the abbey he has created. He works successfully towards the conversion of northern Britain.
- December 25 – At Christmas, Christianity spreads rapidly in Kent; Augustine and his fellow-labourers baptise more than 10,000 Anglo-Saxons.

====== Law ======
- England gets her first written code of laws from Æthelbert. The code is concerned with preserving social order, through compensation and punishment for personal injury (approximate date).

====== Education ======
- The King's School is founded by Augustine in Canterbury. He builds an abbey where the Benedictine teaching takes place.

=== 598 ===
==== By place ====
====== Byzantine Empire ======
- March 30 – Balkan Campaign: The Avars lift the siege of the fortress city of Tomis (modern Romania). A Byzantine army under Comentiolus crosses the Balkan Mountains, and marches along the Danube River to Zikidiba.
- The Avars rout the Byzantine forces of Comentiolus (south of Haemus Mons), and capture Drizipera (Thrace). A large part of their troops are killed by the plague, after many cities are devastated in the Balkan Peninsula.
- Emperor Maurice pays tribute to the Avars and concludes a treaty with their leader Bayan I, allowing Byzantine expeditions in Wallachia. He reorganises his army and strengthens the Long Walls (west of Constantinople).

====== Europe ======
- Maurice makes peace with King Agilulf, conceding northern Italy. Pope Gregory I the Great negotiates a truce, ending 30 years of Lombard terror. Agilulf expands the Lombard Kingdom by occupying Sutri and Perugia.

====== Britain ======
- Battle of Catraeth: The Gododdin under Mynyddog Mwynfawr, Brythonic king of Hen Ogledd ("The Old North"), defeat the Angles of Bernicia and Deira, at the stronghold of Catraeth in Northern England (approximate date).

====== Asia ======
- August 4 – Goguryeo War: Emperor Wéndi orders his youngest son, Yang Liang (assisted by the co-prime minister Gao Jiong), to conquer Goguryeo (Korea) during the rainy season, with a Chinese army (300,000 men).
- The Chinese fleet engages in battle against the Goguryeo fleet (50,000 men) under Admiral Kang I-sik, and is destroyed in the Bohai Sea. During the invasion the Sui forces are all defeated, and Yang Liang is forced to retreat.
- King Yeongyang sends an embassy to Daxing; Wéndi accepts a peace agreement with Goguryeo. He claims a hollow victory, as the Sui dynasty lost nearly 90% of his army and navy during the disastrous campaign.
- Hye becomes king of the Korean kingdom of Baekje.

==== By topic ====
====== Religion ======
- Missionaries begin to convert the Anglo-Saxons to Christianity throughout much of what will later be the British Isles (approximate date).
- The Guoqing Temple is built on Mount Tiantai (Zhejiang), and becomes the site for the teachings of Chinese Buddhism.

=== 599 ===
==== By place ====
====== Byzantine Empire ======
- Emperor Maurice refuses to pay ransom for 12,000 Byzantine soldiers taken prisoner by the Avars. Their leader Bayan I orders the execution of the prisoners, and slaughters them all. His failure to buy back the captives destroys Maurice's popularity with the Byzantine troops in the Balkan Peninsula.
- Summer – Balkan Campaign: The Byzantine generals Priscus and Comentiolus join their forces at Singidunum (modern Belgrade), and move downstream to the fortress city of Viminacium (Serbia). The Byzantines cross the Danube River and invade Upper Moesia, where they defeat the Avars in open battle.
- Priscus pursues the fleeing Avar tribes and invades their homeland in Pannonia. He devastates the land east of the Tisza River, deciding the war for the Byzantines and ending the Avar and Slavic incursions across the Danube.
- Autumn – Comentiolus reopens the Gate of Trajan pass, near Ihtiman (Bulgaria). This strategic mountain pass, whose fortress "Stipon" defends the border between the provinces Thrace and Macedonia, is not used for decades.

====== Europe ======
- Callinicus, governor (exarch) of Ravenna, repulses attacks of the South Slavs in Istria (Croatia). The region is pillaged, but the Byzantines drive them all out.
- Callinicus breaks the truce by kidnapping the Lombard daughter of King Agilulf, beginning a war with the Exarchate of Ravenna (approximate date).

====== Britain ======
- Rædwald becomes king (bretwalda) of East Anglia (East of England), under the overlordship of Æthelberht of Kent (according to the Anglo-Saxon Chronicle).

====== Persia ======
- King Khosrau II sends a Persian expedition to South Arabia and conquers Yemen. He establishes a military base to control the sea trade with the East (approximate date).

====== Asia ======
- Tardu declares himself to be ruler (khagan) of the united Turkic Khaganate (east and west). His new status is not recognised widely in the empire.
- Beop becomes king of the Korean kingdom of Baekje.

====== Mesoamerica ======
- The Maya city of Palenque (southern Mexico) is plundered by King Scroll Serpent of Calakmul (approximate date).

==== By topic ====
====== Religion ======
- Venantius Fortunatus, Latin poet and hymnodist in the Merovingian court, is appointed bishop of Poitiers.

== Births ==
590

- Benjamin, Coptic Orthodox Patriarch of Alexandria (approximate date)
- Boran, Queen of Persia (d. 632)
- Braulio, bishop of Zaragoza (d. 651)
- Cedda, prince of Wessex (approximate date)
- Dervan, prince of the Sorbs (approximate date)
- Eanfrith, king of Bernicia (d. 634)
- Harsha, Indian emperor (d. 647)
- Jajang, Korean monk (d. 658)
- Judicaël, high king of Domnonée (approximate)
- Kavadh II, king of the Sasanian Empire (d. 628)
- Secundus of Non, Lombard abbot
- Sichilde, Frankish queen (d. 627)
- Theodore Rshtuni, Armenian general

591

- Cadwallon ap Cadfan, king of Gwynedd (approximate date)
- Gundeberga, queen of the Lombards
- Li Xiaogong, prince of the Tang dynasty (d. 640)
- Su Dingfang, general of the Tang dynasty (d. 667)

592

- Khalid ibn al-Walid, Arab general (approximate date)
- Asmā' bint Abi Bakr, companion of Muhammad
- Cutha Cathwulf, prince of Wessex (approximate date)
- Itta, wife of Pepin of Landen (d. 652)
- Xu Jingzong, chancellor of the Tang dynasty (d. 672)

593

- Jomei, emperor of Japan (d. 641)
- Zaynab bint Jahsh, wife of Muhammad (d. 641)

594

- Kōgyoku, empress of Japan (d. 661)
- Li Shiji, general and chancellor of the Tang dynasty (d. 669)
- Zubayr ibn al-Awwam, companion of Muhammad (d. 656)

approximate date

- Ali ibn Abi Talib born(13 rajab), first Shia Imam (d. 661)
- Maymuna bint al-Harith, wife of Muhammad
- Ramla bint Abi Sufyan, wife of Muhammad

595

- Asmā' bint Abu Bakr, female disciple (Sahaba) of Muhammad (d. 695)
- Cen Wenben, chancellor and editor of the Book of Zhou (d. 645)
- Kim Yu-shin, general of Silla (Korea) (d. 673)
- Sa`d ibn Abi Waqqas, companion of Muhammad (d. 674)
- Talhah, disciple and companion of Muhammad (approximate date)
- Zaynab bint Khuzayma, wife of Muhammad (d. 627)

596

- Cui Dunli, general of the Tang dynasty (d. 656)
- Daoxuan, Chinese Buddhist monk (d. 667)
- Gao Jifu, chancellor of the Tang dynasty (d. 654)
- Kōtoku, emperor of Japan (d. 654)
- Liu Xiangdao, official of the Tang dynasty (d. 666)

597

- Chu Suiliang, chancellor of the Tang dynasty (d. 658)
- Fursey, Irish missionary saint (approximate date)

598

- January 28 – Taizong, emperor of the Tang dynasty (d. 649)
- Dou Dexuan, high official of the Tang dynasty (d. 666)
- Du Fuwei, rebel leader during the Sui dynasty (d. 624)
- Pingyang, princess of the Tang dynasty (d. 623)
- Brahmagupta, Indian mathematician and astronomer (d. 668)
- Gomentrude, Frankish queen consort (fl. 630)

599

- January 23 – Tai Zong, emperor of the Tang dynasty (d. 649)

== Deaths ==
590

- February 7 – Pope Pelagius II (b. 520)
- September 5 – Authari, king of the Lombards
- Blane, Scottish bishop and saint
- Eormenric, king of Kent (England)
- Gisulf I, duke of Friuli (Italy)
- Guaram I, king of Iberia (Georgia)
- Hormizd IV, king of the Persian Empire
- Ermelinde, Brabant Saint (b. 510)

591

- Aredius, abbot and saint
- Faroald I, duke of Spoleto (or 592)
- Garibald I, duke of Bavaria (b. 540)
- Golindouch, Persian saint
- John Mystacon, Byzantine general (approximate date)
- Peter III of Raqqa, Patriarch of Antioch
- Li Delin, Chinese official and writer (b. 531)
- Yan Zhitui, Chinese scholar and official (b. 531)
- Zotto, founder of the Duchy of Benevento

592

- January 28 – Guntram, king of Burgundy
- Faroald I, duke of Spoleto (Italy)
- Sushun, emperor of Japan

593

- Ceawlin, king of Wessex (approximate date)
- Creoda, king of Mercia (approximate date)
- Eberigisil, bishop of Cologne (approximate date)
- Gregory, patriarch of Antioch (approximate date)
- Hussa, king of Bernicia (approximate date)
- Ino Anastasia, Byzantine empress consort
- Paul, father of Maurice (approximate date)

594

- November 17 – Gregory of Tours, bishop and historian
- John IV, patriarch of Jerusalem (approximate date)

595

- September 2 – John IV, patriarch of Constantinople
- Berach, Irish bishop and saint
- Childebert II, king of Austrasia (b. 570)
- Dynod Bwr, king of Hen Ogledd (approximate date)
- Euin, Lombard duke of Trent (Italy)
- Gartnait II, king of the Picts
- Owain mab Urien, king of Rheged (approximate date)
- Yuchi Chifan, empress of Northern Zhou (b. 566)

596

- Ebrulf, Frankish hermit and abbot (b. 517)
- Marius Aventicensis, bishop of Aventicum (b. 532)

597

- June 9 – Columba, Gaelic Irish missionary (b. 521)
- Brenainn mac Cairbre, king of Uí Maine (or 601)
- Ceol, king of Wessex (England)
- Fredegund, queen and regent of Neustria
- Kirtivarman I, king of the Chalukya dynasty (India)
- Zhiyi, de facto founder of Tiantai Buddhism (b. 538)

598

- Áed mac Ainmuirech, High King of Ireland
- Dallán Forgaill, Christian Irish poet
- Wideok, king of Baekje (Korea) (b. 525)

599

- Anastasius I, patriarch of Antioch
- Hye, king of Baekje (Korea)
- Taliesin, Brythonic poet (approximate date)
- Tulan Qaghan, ruler (khagan) of the Göktürks
