= 590 =

Calendar year

590 in various calendars
- Gregorian calendar: 590; DXC
- Ab urbe condita: 1343
- Armenian calendar: 39; ԹՎ ԼԹ
- Assyrian calendar: 5340
- Balinese saka calendar: 511–512
- Bengali calendar: −4 – −3
- Berber calendar: 1540
- Buddhist calendar: 1134
- Burmese calendar: −48
- Byzantine calendar: 6098–6099
- Chinese calendar: 己酉年 (Earth Rooster); 3287 or 3080 — to — 庚戌年 (Metal Dog); 3288 or 3081
- Coptic calendar: 306–307
- Discordian calendar: 1756
- Ethiopian calendar: 582–583
- Hebrew calendar: 4350–4351
- Hindu calendars
- Vikram Samvat: 646–647
- Shaka Samvat: 511–512
- Kali Yuga: 3690–3691
- Holocene calendar: 10590
- Iranian calendar: 32 BP – 31 BP
- Islamic calendar: 33 BH – 32 BH
- Javanese calendar: 479–480
- Julian calendar: 590; DXC
- Korean calendar: 2923
- Minguo calendar: 1322 before ROC 民前1322年
- Nanakshahi calendar: −878
- Seleucid era: 901/902 AG
- Thai solar calendar: 1132–1133
- Tibetan calendar: ས་མོ་བྱ་ལོ་ (female Earth-Bird); 716 or 335 or −437 — to — ལྕགས་ཕོ་ཁྱི་ལོ་ (male Iron-Dog); 717 or 336 or −436

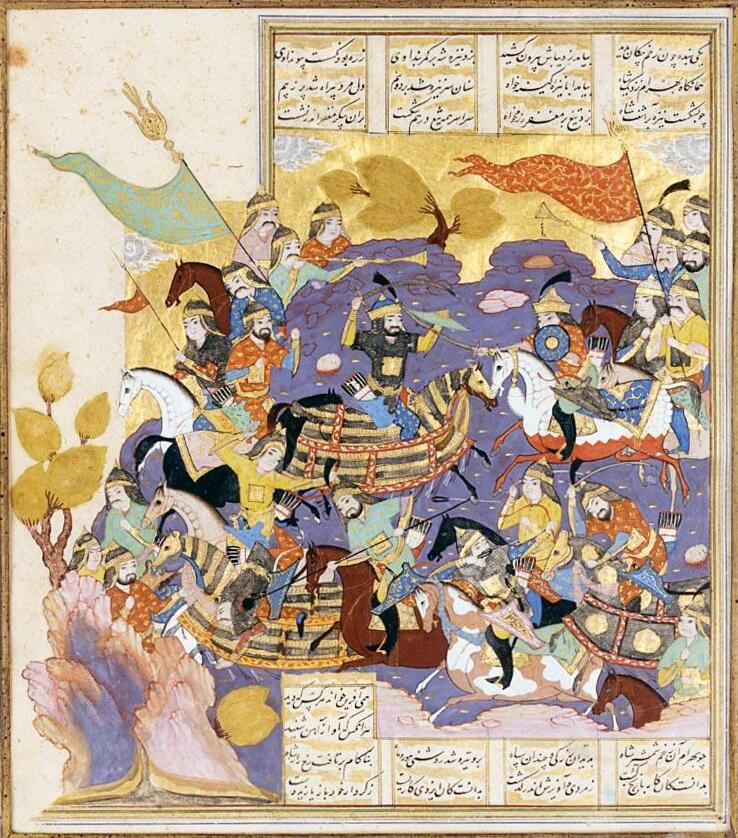
Battle between Khosrau II and Bahrām Chobin

Year 590 (DXC) was a common year starting on Sunday of the Julian calendar. The denomination 590 for this year has been used since the early medieval period, when the Anno Domini calendar era became the prevalent method in Europe for naming years.

== Events ==
=== By place ===
==== Byzantine Empire ====
- Byzantine–Sassanid War: Emperor Maurice defeats the Persian forces under Bahrām Chobin at Nisibis (modern Turkey), and drives them back into Armenia.
- Comentiolus, commander (magister militum) of the eastern army, receives the legitimate Persian king, Khosrau II, as a refugee in his headquarters at Hierapolis.
- Maurice establishes the Exarchate of Carthage in Africa. He combines the civil authority of a praetorian prefect and the military authority, based at Carthage.
- March 26 – Theodosius, eldest son of Maurice, is proclaimed as co-emperor. He becomes his father's heir to the Byzantine throne.
- Stephen I succeeds his father Guaram I as king of Iberia (Georgia) (approximate date).

==== Europe ====
- The Franks and Burgundians under King Guntram invade Italy. They capture the cities Milan and Verona, but are forced to leave by a plague outbreak in the Po Valley.
- The Franks again invade Italy; they capture Modena and Mantua. Several Lombard dukes defect: Gisulf I, duke of Friuli, is defeated and replaced by his son Gisulf II.
- September 5 – King Authari dies (possibly by poison) after a six-year reign, and is succeeded by Agilulf, duke (dux) of Turin, who marries his widow Theodelinda.
- Frankish rebellion led by Basina, daughter of Chilperic I.

==== Britain ====
- Æthelberht succeeds his father Eormenric as king (bretwalda) of Kent (according to the Anglo-Saxon Chronicle).
- Siege of Lindisfarne: A Brythonic coalition lays siege to King Hussa of Bernicia at Lindisfarne Castle (Holy Island).
- Owain mab Urien succeeds his father Urien, as Brythonic king of Rheged in Northern England (approximate date).

==== Persia ====
- Spring – King Hormizd IV dismisses Bahrām Chobin as commander (Eran spahbed). He revolts and marches with the support of the Persian army towards Ctesiphon.
- February 15 – Hormizd IV is deposed and assassinated by Persian nobles. Having ruled since 579, he is succeeded by his son Khosrau II as king of the Persian Empire.
- September – Bahrām Chobin defeats the inferior forces of Khosrau II near Ctesiphon. He seizes the throne and proclaims himself as king Bahrām IV of Persia.

==== Asia ====
- Kadungon becomes king of the Pandyan Kingdom in South India (approximate date).
- Yeongyang becomes ruler of the Korean kingdom of Goguryeo.

=== By topic ===
==== Religion ====
- February 7 – Pope Pelagius II falls victim to the plague that devastated Rome. He is succeeded by Gregory I, age 50, as the 64th pope, and the first from a monastic background.
- Egidius, bishop of Reims, is tried at Metz before a council of bishops for a conspiracy against King Childebert II; he is found guilty and exiled to Strasbourg.
- Gregory I begins a vigorous program of rebuilding aqueducts and restoring Rome. He feeds the citizens with doles of grain, as under Roman imperial rule.
- Columbanus, Irish missionary, obtains from King Guntram the Gallo-Roman castle Luxovium (Luxeuil-les-Bains), where he founds the Abbey of Luxeuil.
- John of Biclaro, Visigoth chronicler, finishes his "Chronicle" before he is appointed bishop of Girona (Catalonia, Spain).

== Births ==
- Benjamin, Coptic Orthodox Patriarch of Alexandria (approximate date)
- Boran, Queen of Persia (d. 632)
- Braulio, bishop of Zaragoza (d. 651)
- Cedda, prince of Wessex (approximate date)
- Dervan, prince of the Sorbs (approximate date)
- Eanfrith, king of Bernicia (d. 634)
- Harsha, Indian emperor (d. 647)
- Jajang, Korean monk (d. 658)
- Judicaël, high king of Domnonée (approximate)
- Kavadh II, king of the Sasanian Empire (d. 628)
- Secundus of Non, Lombard abbot
- Sichilde, Frankish queen (d. 627)
- Theodore Rshtuni, Armenian general

== Deaths ==
- February 7 – Pope Pelagius II (b. 520)
- September 5 – Authari, king of the Lombards
- Blane, Scottish bishop and saint
- Eormenric, king of Kent (England)
- Gisulf I, duke of Friuli (Italy)
- Guaram I, king of Iberia (Georgia)
- Hormizd IV, king of the Persian Empire
- Ermelinde, Brabant Saint (b. 510)
