= 580 =

Calendar year

580 in various calendars
- Gregorian calendar: 580; DLXXX
- Ab urbe condita: 1333
- Armenian calendar: 29; ԹՎ ԻԹ
- Assyrian calendar: 5330
- Balinese saka calendar: 501–502
- Bengali calendar: −14 – −13
- Berber calendar: 1530
- Buddhist calendar: 1124
- Burmese calendar: −58
- Byzantine calendar: 6088–6089
- Chinese calendar: 己亥年 (Earth Pig); 3277 or 3070 — to — 庚子年 (Metal Rat); 3278 or 3071
- Coptic calendar: 296–297
- Discordian calendar: 1746
- Ethiopian calendar: 572–573
- Hebrew calendar: 4340–4341
- Hindu calendars
- Vikram Samvat: 636–637
- Shaka Samvat: 501–502
- Kali Yuga: 3680–3681
- Holocene calendar: 10580
- Iranian calendar: 42 BP – 41 BP
- Islamic calendar: 43 BH – 42 BH
- Javanese calendar: 469–470
- Julian calendar: 580; DLXXX
- Korean calendar: 2913
- Minguo calendar: 1332 before ROC 民前1332年
- Nanakshahi calendar: −888
- Seleucid era: 891/892 AG
- Thai solar calendar: 1122–1123
- Tibetan calendar: ས་མོ་ཕག་ལོ་ (female Earth-Boar); 706 or 325 or −447 — to — ལྕགས་ཕོ་བྱི་བ་ལོ་ (male Iron-Rat); 707 or 326 or −446

Year 580 (DLXXX) was a leap year starting on Monday of the Julian calendar. The denomination 580 for this year has been used since the early medieval period, when the Anno Domini calendar era became the prevalent method in Europe for naming years.

== Events ==
=== By place ===
==== Byzantine Empire ====
- The Roman Senate sends an embassy to Constantinople, with a gift (3,000 pounds of gold) to Emperor Tiberius II Constantine, along with a plea for help against the Lombards.
- The Slavs begin to migrate into the Balkan Peninsula. The Avars, under King (khagan) Bayan I, invade the Lower Danube (modern Bulgaria).
- Siege of Sirmium: The Avars march to the right bank of the River Sava, and besiege the Byzantine stronghold of Sirmium (Pannonia).

==== Europe ====
- The Lombards drive the last Ostrogoths across the Alps (Northern Italy). During the "Rule of the Dukes" the Lombards adopt Roman titles, names, and traditions.
- King Liuvigild calls for an Arian synod in Toledo (central Spain), which modifies several doctrines; he tries to unify the Christians within the Visigothic Kingdom.

==== Britain ====
- Æthelberht succeeds his father Eormenric as king (bretwalda) of Kent (approximate date).

==== Asia ====
- The Northern Zhou dynasty, strategically based in the basin of the Wei River, is supreme in Northern China. In the south only the Chen dynasty remains a rival.
- The Chinese city of Ye (Henan) is razed to the ground by Yang Jian, future founder of the Sui dynasty, who defeats a resistance force under Yuchi Jiong.

=== By topic ===
==== Religion ====
- Gregory of Tours is brought before a council of bishops, on charges of slandering the Frankish queen Fredegund (approximate date).

== Births ==
- Abdel Rahman ibn Awf, companion of Muhammad
- Bilal ibn Rabah al-Habashi, companion of Muhammad
- Cadfan ap Iago, king of Gwynedd (approximate date)
- Clemen ap Bledric, king of Dumnonia (approximate date)
- Dayi Daoxin, Chán Buddhist patriarch (d. 651)
- Didier of Cahors, Frankish bishop (approximate date)
- Fabia Eudokia, Byzantine empress (approximate date)
- Livinus, Irish apostle (approximate date)
- Maximus the Confessor, monk and theologian (d. 662)
- Pepin the Elder, Frankish Mayor of the Palace (d. 640)
- Umm Salama, wife of Muhammad (approximate date)
- Wei Zheng, chancellor of the Tang dynasty (d. 643)

== Deaths ==
- Audovera, wife of Chilperic I (approximate date)
- Bacurius III, king of Iberia (Georgia)
- Dorotheus of Gaza, monk and abbot (approximate date)
- Eormenric, king of Kent (approximate date)
- Galam Cennalath, king of the Picts
- Gao Anagong, high official of Northern Qi
- Martin of Braga, missionary and archbishop
- Wei Xiaokuan, general of Western Wei (b. 509)
- Xuan Di, emperor of Northern Zhou (b. 559)
- Yuchi Jiong, general of Northern Zhou
