= 579 =

Calendar year

579 in various calendars
Gregorian calendar	579; DLXXIX
Ab urbe condita	1332
Armenian calendar	28; ԹՎ ԻԸ
Assyrian calendar	5329
Balinese saka calendar	500–501
Bengali calendar	−15 – −14
Berber calendar	1529
Buddhist calendar	1123
Burmese calendar	−59
Byzantine calendar	6087–6088
Chinese calendar	戊戌年 (Earth Dog); 3276 or 3069 — to — 己亥年 (Earth Pig); 3277 or 3070
Coptic calendar	295–296
Discordian calendar	1745
Ethiopian calendar	571–572
Hebrew calendar	4339–4340
- Hindu calendars
Vikram Samvat	635–636
Shaka Samvat	500–501
Kali Yuga	3679–3680
Holocene calendar	10579
Iranian calendar	43 BP – 42 BP
Islamic calendar	44 BH – 43 BH
Javanese calendar	468–469
Julian calendar	579; DLXXIX
Korean calendar	2912
Minguo calendar	1333 before ROC 民前1333年
Nanakshahi calendar	−889
Seleucid era	890/891 AG
Thai solar calendar	1121–1122
Tibetan calendar	阳土狗年 (male Earth-Dog); 705 or 324 or −448 — to — 阴土猪年 (female Earth-Pig); 706 or 325 or −447

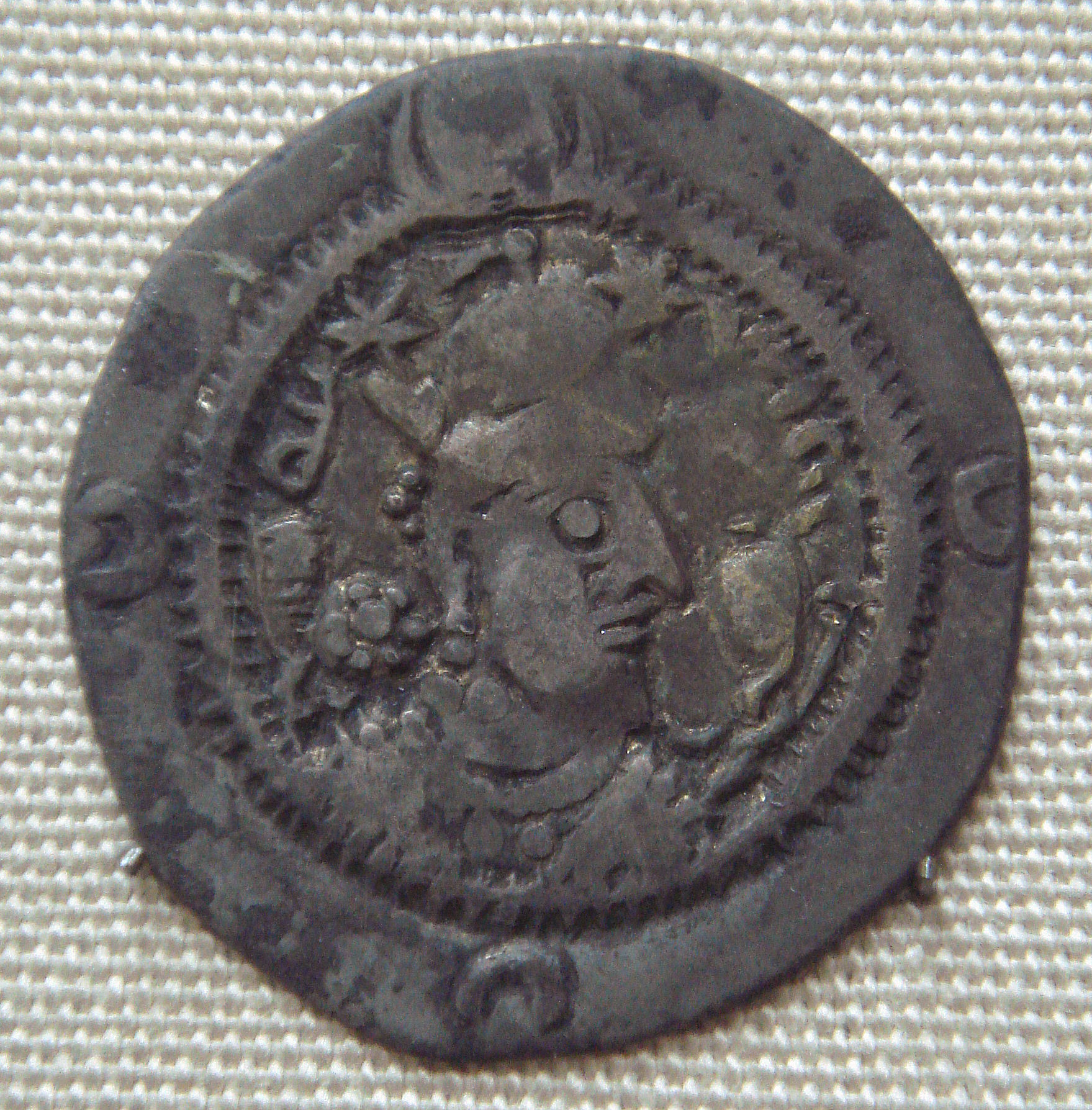
King Hormizd IV (579 – 590)

Year 579 (DLXXIX) was a common year starting on Sunday of the Julian calendar. The denomination 579 for this year has been used since the early medieval period, when the Anno Domini calendar era became the prevalent method in Europe for naming years.

== Events ==
=== By place ===
==== Byzantine Empire ====
- Byzantine-Sassanid War: King Khosrau I seeks peace, but dies before an agreement can be reached. The Mesopotamian front becomes stalemated, and Maurice (magister militum of the East) fortifies the borders in Armenia and Syria.

==== Central America ====
- September 2 – Uneh Chan becomes the ruler of the Mayan city state of Calakmul in southern Mexico and reigns until 611.

==== Europe ====
- Hermenegild, son of Visigothic king Liuvigild, marries Ingund. He rebels against his father, starting in Seville (Southern Spain), and declares himself Catholic.
- Heavy taxes levied by Merovingian king Chilperic I of Neustria produce a revolt at Limoges (central France), as he sells bishoprics to the highest bidder.

==== Britain ====
- Frithuwald succeeds his brother Theodoric as king of Bernicia (Scotland). He rules from 579–585 (approximate date).

==== Persia ====
- Khosrau I dies after a 48-year reign, during which he has extended his realm from the River Oxus to the Red Sea. He is succeeded by his son Hormizd IV, who becomes king of the Persian Empire.
- Summer – Hormizd IV refuses to give up territories, and breaks off negotiations with the Byzantine Empire. The Türks invade Khorasan and reach Hyrcania on the Caspian Sea.

==== Asia ====
- Emperor Xuan Di abdicates the throne to his son Jing Di, age 6, and rules as regent the Northern Zhou dynasty.
- Jinpyeong becomes king of the Korean kingdom of Silla.

=== By topic ===
==== Religion ====
- July 30 – Pope Benedict I dies after a 4-year reign, and is succeeded by Pelagius II as the 63rd pope. During the Lombard siege of Rome, he labors to solve the problems of famine.
- Pelagius II sends Gregory as his apocrisiarius (ambassador to the imperial court in Constantinople). He is part of a Roman delegation to ask for military aid against the Lombards.
- Leander, Catholic bishop of Seville, is exiled by Liuvigild and withdraws to Constantinople. At the Byzantine court he composes works against Arianism (approximate date).

== Births ==
- Fang Xuanling, chancellor of the Tang dynasty (d. 648)

== Deaths ==
- July 30 – Pope Benedict I
- Khosrau I, king of the Persian Empire
- Theodric, king of Bernicia (Scotland)
