= 542 =

Calendar year

542 in various calendars
Gregorian calendar	542; DXLII
Ab urbe condita	1295
Assyrian calendar	5292
Balinese saka calendar	463–464
Bengali calendar	−52 – −51
Berber calendar	1492
Buddhist calendar	1086
Burmese calendar	−96
Byzantine calendar	6050–6051
Chinese calendar	辛酉年 (Metal Rooster); 3239 or 3032 — to — 壬戌年 (Water Dog); 3240 or 3033
Coptic calendar	258–259
Discordian calendar	1708
Ethiopian calendar	534–535
Hebrew calendar	4302–4303
- Hindu calendars
Vikram Samvat	598–599
Shaka Samvat	463–464
Kali Yuga	3642–3643
Holocene calendar	10542
Iranian calendar	80 BP – 79 BP
Islamic calendar	83 BH – 81 BH
Javanese calendar	429–430
Julian calendar	542; DXLII
Korean calendar	2875
Minguo calendar	1370 before ROC 民前1370年
Nanakshahi calendar	−926
Seleucid era	853/854 AG
Thai solar calendar	1084–1085
Tibetan calendar	ལྕགས་མོ་བྱ་ལོ་ (female Iron-Bird); 668 or 287 or −485 — to — ཆུ་ཕོ་ཁྱི་ལོ་ (male Water-Dog); 669 or 288 or −484

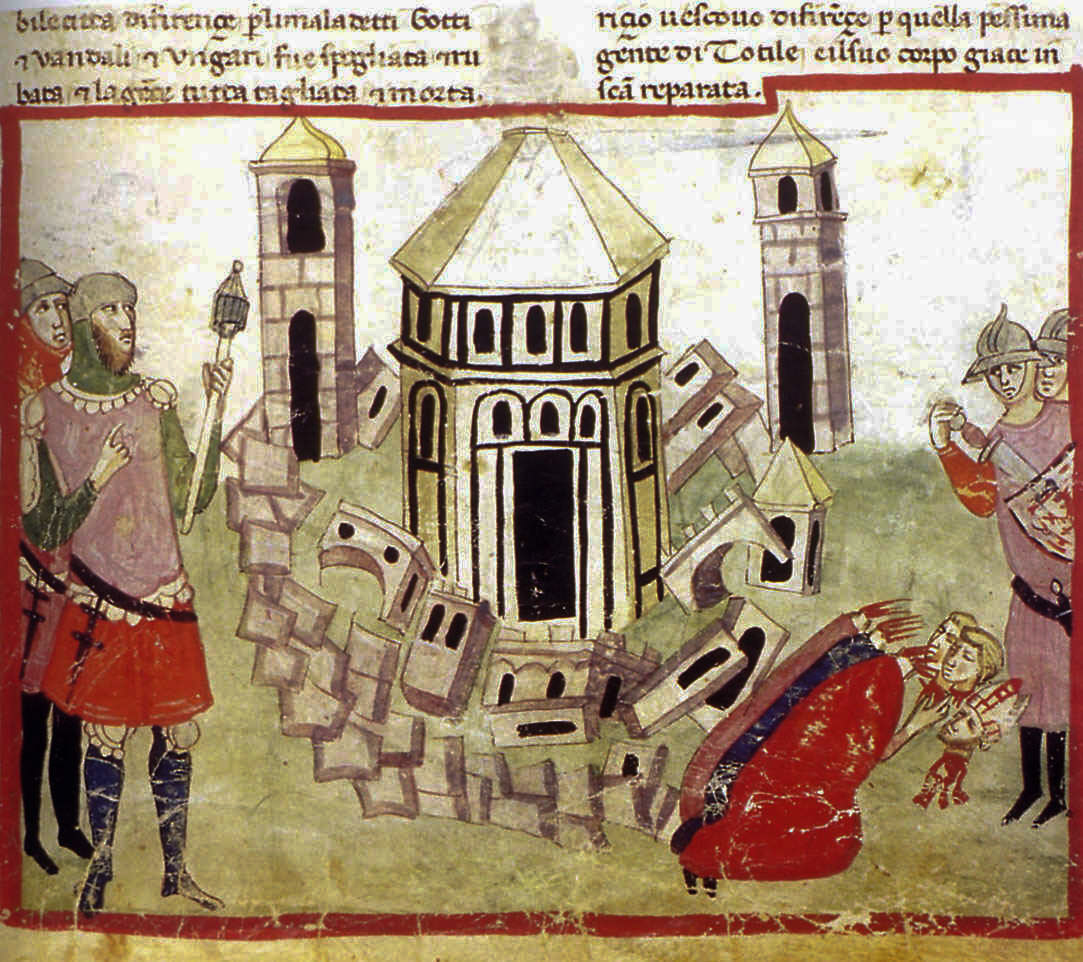
King Totila razes the walls of Florence

Year 542 (DXLII) was a common year starting on Wednesday of the Julian calendar. From this year forward, the appointment of particular Roman consuls was abandoned and the office was merged with that of Byzantine emperor. Thus, the consular year dating was abandoned in practice, even though it formally remained until the end of the 9th century. The denomination 542 for this year has been used since the early medieval period, when the Anno Domini calendar era became the prevalent method in Europe for naming years.

== Events ==
=== By place ===
==== Byzantine Empire ====
- Plague of Justinian: Bubonic plague, spread from Egypt, kills at least 230,000 in Constantinople (modern Istanbul; before counting stops), and perhaps two million or more in the rest of the empire. Emperor Justinian I contracts the disease but recovers.
- Lazic War – Justinian I sends a Byzantine army (30,000 men) to Armenia. The Persians, severely outnumbered, are forced to retreat, but at Dvin the Byzantines are defeated by a force of 4,000 men in an ambush, and are completely routed.
- The 542 Sea of Marmara earthquake takes place in the winter of 542, in the vicinity of the Sea of Marmara. It also affects the coasts of Thrace and the Edremit Gulf.

==== Europe ====
- Spring – Battle of Faventia: King Totila scatters the Byzantine forces near Faventia (modern Faenza) with 5,000 men, beginning the resurgence of Gothic resistance to the reconquest of Italy.
- Battle of Mucellium: Totila marches down into Tuscany and defeats the Byzantines at Florence, in the valley of Mugello. He treats his prisoners well, and many are induced to join his banner.
- March – Totila bypasses Rome and begins his expedition in Southern Italy. He captures Beneventum and receives the submission of the provinces of Apulia, Lucania and Bruttium.
- Siege of Naples: Totila besieges the city of Naples in Campania. A Byzantine relief force from Sicily is intercepted and almost destroyed by Gothic warships.
- King Childebert I and his brother Chlothar I invade Visigothic Spain. They capture Pamplona, but Zaragoza withstands a siege and the Franks retreat to Gaul. From this expedition Childebert brings back to Paris a relic, the tunic of Saint Vincent.

=== By topic ===
==== Religion ====
- Brendan establishes a monastic settlement on Eileach an Naoimh (approximate date).

==== Literature ====
- Gildas, British monk, writes his work "De Excidio et Conquestu Britanniae" (approximate date).

== Births ==
- Su Wei, high official of the Sui dynasty (d. 623)
- Xiao Min Di, emperor of Northern Zhou (d. 557)
- Xiao Ming Di, emperor of the Liang dynasty (d. 585)

== Deaths ==
- August 27 – Caesarius, bishop of Arles
- Eógan Bél, king of Connacht (Ireland)
