= 597 =

Calendar year

597 in various calendars
- Gregorian calendar: 597; DXCVII
- Ab urbe condita: 1350
- Armenian calendar: 46; ԹՎ ԽԶ
- Assyrian calendar: 5347
- Balinese saka calendar: 518–519
- Bengali calendar: 3–4
- Berber calendar: 1547
- Buddhist calendar: 1141
- Burmese calendar: −41
- Byzantine calendar: 6105–6106
- Chinese calendar: 丙辰年 (Fire Dragon); 3294 or 3087 — to — 丁巳年 (Fire Snake); 3295 or 3088
- Coptic calendar: 313–314
- Discordian calendar: 1763
- Ethiopian calendar: 589–590
- Hebrew calendar: 4357–4358
- Hindu calendars
- Vikram Samvat: 653–654
- Shaka Samvat: 518–519
- Kali Yuga: 3697–3698
- Holocene calendar: 10597
- Iranian calendar: 25 BP – 24 BP
- Islamic calendar: 26 BH – 25 BH
- Javanese calendar: 486–487
- Julian calendar: 597; DXCVII
- Korean calendar: 2930
- Minguo calendar: 1315 before ROC 民前1315年
- Nanakshahi calendar: −871
- Seleucid era: 908/909 AG
- Thai solar calendar: 1139–1140
- Tibetan calendar: མེ་ཕོ་འབྲུག་ལོ་ (male Fire-Dragon); 723 or 342 or −430 — to — མེ་མོ་སྦྲུལ་ལོ་ (female Fire-Snake); 724 or 343 or −429

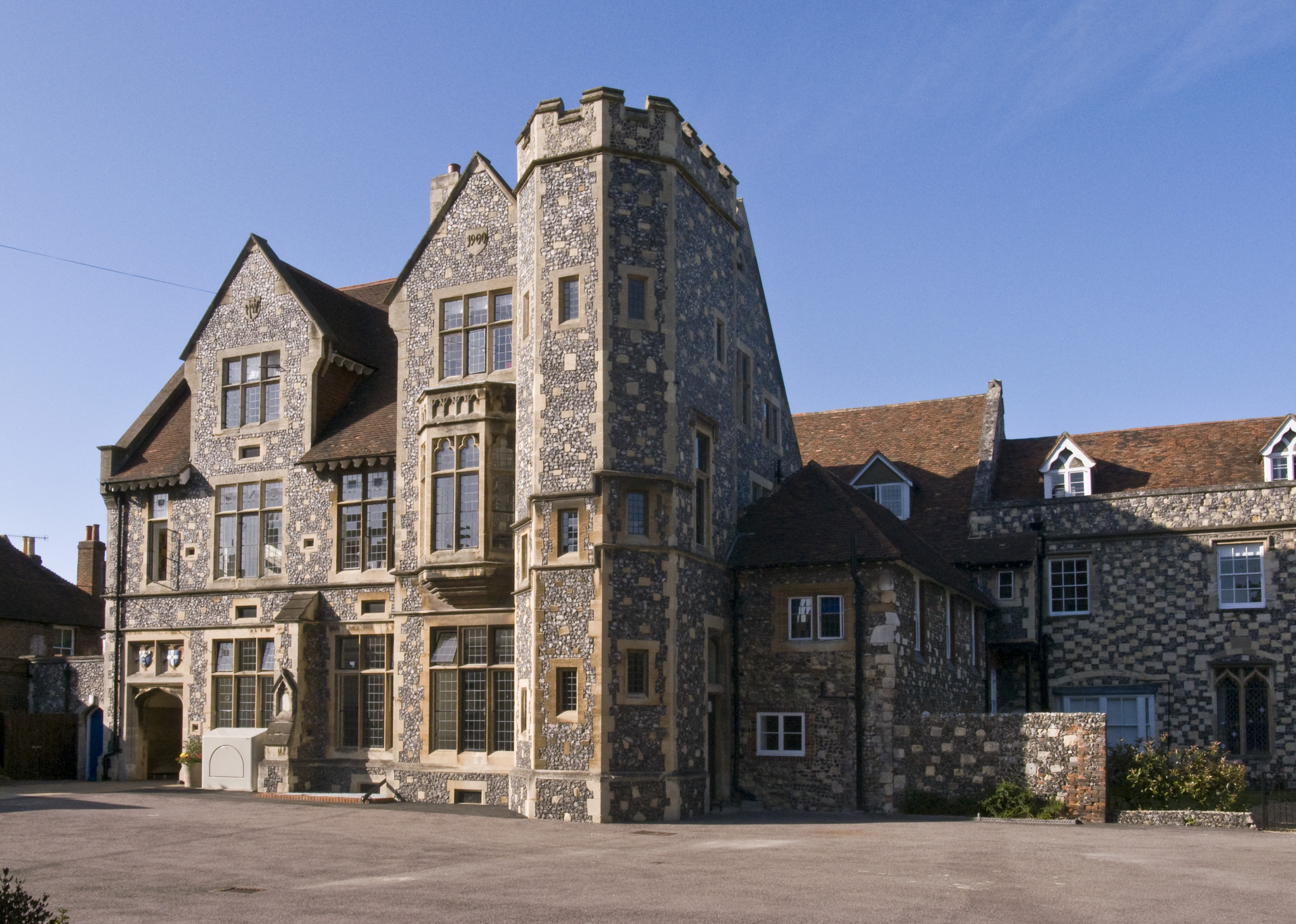
The King's School, Canterbury (England)

Year 597 (DXCVII) was a common year starting on Tuesday of the Julian calendar. The denomination 597 for this year has been used since the early medieval period, when the Anno Domini calendar era became the prevalent method in Europe for naming years.

== Events ==
=== By place ===
==== Byzantine Empire ====
- Emperor Maurice writes his last will, in which he describes his ideas for governing the Byzantine Empire (his eldest son, Theodosius, will rule the East from Constantinople, and his second son, Tiberius, the West from Rome).
- Autumn – Balkan Campaign: The Avars, strengthened by the tribute of the Franks, resume their campaign along the Danube River, and besiege the Byzantine fortress city of Tomis (modern Romania) on the Black Sea coast.

==== Europe ====
- Queen Fredegund defeats her old rival Brunhilda of Austrasia, who supports the claims of her grandsons Theudebert II and Theuderic II to the Frankish throne, against those of Fredegund's son Chlothar II. She dies a few months later at Paris and is buried in the Basilica of Saint Denis.
- Chlothar II, age 13, becomes sole ruler of Neustria, and continues his mother's feud with Brunhilda. He is advised to prepare for war against Austrasia, the eastern part of the Frankish Kingdom.

==== Britain ====
- Ceolwulf succeeds his brother Ceol as king of Wessex. He becomes regent of Ceol's son Cynegils who is too young to inherit the throne.

==== Asia ====
- Mangalesha becomes king of the Chalukya dynasty, after his brother Kirtivarman I dies. He rules as regent of Kirtivarman's son Pulakeshin II, and invades the territory of Khandesh and Gujarat (northwestern India).

=== By topic ===
==== Religion ====
- Gregorian Mission: Augustine of Canterbury lands with a group of missionaries on the Isle of Thanet (South East England). He is welcomed by King Æthelberht of Kent, who accepts baptism (along with the rest of his court) at the behest of his Christian Frankish wife, Bertha. Æthelbert assigns Augustine and his 40 monks a residence at Canterbury, where they found a Benedictine monastery that will make the town a centre of Christianity (or 596).
- June 9 – Columba, Irish missionary, dies in Iona (Inner Hebrides) and is buried by his monks in the abbey he has created. He works successfully towards the conversion of northern Britain.
- December 25 – At Christmas, Christianity spreads rapidly in Kent; Augustine and his fellow-labourers baptise more than 10,000 Anglo-Saxons.

==== Law ====
- England gets her first written code of laws from Æthelbert. The code is concerned with preserving social order, through compensation and punishment for personal injury (approximate date).

==== Education ====
- The King's School is founded by Augustine in Canterbury. He builds an abbey where the Benedictine teaching takes place.

== Births ==
- Chu Suiliang, chancellor of the Tang dynasty (d. 658)
- Fursey, Irish missionary saint (approximate date)

== Deaths ==
- June 9 – Columba, Gaelic Irish missionary (b. 521)
- Brenainn mac Cairbre, king of Uí Maine (or 601)
- Ceol, king of Wessex (England)
- Fredegund, queen and regent of Neustria
- Kirtivarman I, king of the Chalukya dynasty (India)
- Zhiyi, de facto founder of Tiantai Buddhism (b. 538)
