= 574 =

Calendar year

574 in various calendars
- Gregorian calendar: 574; DLXXIV
- Ab urbe condita: 1327
- Armenian calendar: 23; ԹՎ ԻԳ
- Assyrian calendar: 5324
- Balinese saka calendar: 495–496
- Bengali calendar: −20 – −19
- Berber calendar: 1524
- Buddhist calendar: 1118
- Burmese calendar: −64
- Byzantine calendar: 6082–6083
- Chinese calendar: 癸巳年 (Water Snake); 3271 or 3064 — to — 甲午年 (Wood Horse); 3272 or 3065
- Coptic calendar: 290–291
- Discordian calendar: 1740
- Ethiopian calendar: 566–567
- Hebrew calendar: 4334–4335
- Hindu calendars
- Vikram Samvat: 630–631
- Shaka Samvat: 495–496
- Kali Yuga: 3674–3675
- Holocene calendar: 10574
- Iranian calendar: 48 BP – 47 BP
- Islamic calendar: 50 BH – 48 BH
- Javanese calendar: 462–463
- Julian calendar: 574; DLXXIV
- Korean calendar: 2907
- Minguo calendar: 1338 before ROC 民前1338年
- Nanakshahi calendar: −894
- Seleucid era: 885/886 AG
- Thai solar calendar: 1116–1117
- Tibetan calendar: ཆུ་མོ་སྦྲུལ་ལོ་ (female Water-Snake); 700 or 319 or −453 — to — ཤིང་ཕོ་རྟ་ལོ་ (male Wood-Horse); 701 or 320 or −452

Year 574 (DLXXIV) was a common year starting on Monday of the Julian calendar. The denomination 574 for this year has been used since the early medieval period, when the Anno Domini calendar era became the prevalent method in Europe for naming years.

== Events ==
=== By place ===
==== Byzantine Empire ====
- December 7 – Emperor Justin II retires due to recurring seizures of insanity; he abdicates the throne in favour of his general Tiberius. Justin proclaims him Caesar and adopts him as his own son.
- Winter – Empress Sophia and Tiberius agree to a one year truce with the Persians, at the cost of 45,000 solidi. The truce applies only to the Mesopotamian front; in the Caucasus, war continues.

==== Europe ====
- King Cleph is murdered after an 18-month reign by a guard, a slave who he has mistreated. For the next decade, the Lombard Kingdom is governed by independent duchies (Rule of the Dukes).
- The Visigoths under King Liuvigild invade Cantabria (Northern Spain), and destroy the city of Amaya (Burgos). He massacres the inhabitants and adds the province to the Visigothic Kingdom.
- Áedán mac Gabráin becomes king of Dál Riata (Scotland) (approximate Date).

==== Asia ====
- The Persian Empire overthrows the Axumite- and Byzantine-affiliated regimes in Yemen (Arabian Peninsula).

==== Unidentified ====
- A major volcanic eruption occurs in the Antarctic.

=== By topic ===
==== Religion ====
- July 13 – Pope John III dies at Rome after a 13-year tenure. The Holy See becomes sede vacante until June of the following year.
- Marius Aventicensis is made bishop of Aventicum (modern Avenches).

== Births ==
- February 7 – Shōtoku, prince and regent of Japan (d. 622)
- Xiao Yu, prince of the Liang Dynasty (d. 647)

== Deaths ==
- July 13 – Pope John III
- Cleph, king of the Lombards (or 575)
- Conall mac Comgaill, king of Dál Riata
- Xuan, empress of Northern Zhou
- Queen Jiso
