= 538 (disambiguation) =

538 was a year in the Julian calendar.

538 may also refer to:

- The number of electors in the United States Electoral College
- FiveThirtyEight, American political and statistical analysis blog
- Radio 538, Dutch radio station aimed at young people
- The number 538, see 500 (number) § 530s
