= Oisc of Kent =

Legendary king of Kent

Oisc (early Old English [øːsk] or [øːʃ]), or, in a later spelling, Ēsc ([eːʃ]) was, if he existed, an early king of Kent and, according to Bede, the eponymous founder of the tribe known as Oiscingas (early Old English ['øːʃiŋgas].

== Etymology and spellings ==
Most scholars agree that, like many names in the Germanic languages, the root of the name Oisc is an Old English word ōs, meaning '(non-Christian) god', cognate with Old Norse Áss (deriving from Proto-Germanic *ansuz). The etymology of the name has been studied most thoroughly by John Insley, who concluded that cognate forms of the name Oisc are found in Old Saxon (Ōsic, alongside the corresponding weak noun Ōsica), to which later scholarship possibly adds the runic inscription on a shield boss dating from between 150 and 220 CE found on Thorsberg moor in Schleswig-Holstein which in 2015 Lisbeth M. Imer interpreted as a Roman-influenced maker's mark reading aṇsgz h.

In Insley's interpretation, in Oisc the ōs element is combined with a suffix which in Proto-Germanic took the form **ika, which in this context had a diminutive function. The name was thus a hypocoristic (nickname) form of longer Germanic dithematic names beginning in Ōs- such as Ōswald and Ōsrīc. In this reading, the phonetic development of the name from Proto-Germanic to early Old English was *[ans-ika-] => *[oːs-ika-] (by the Ingvaeonic nasal spirant law) => [øːs-ika-] (by i-mutation) => [øːsk] (by high vowel loss and apocope). This form was represented graphically in early Old English as Oisc and Oesc. Later in Old English, the vowel [øː] developed to [eː], giving the spelling Ēsc.

Bernard Mees, however, has suggested that Oisc and its cognates come from the Germanic root *an found in, for example, the Old Norse verb anda ('to breathe'), combined with the suffix *sk; other adjectives formed with this suffix generally mean something like 'quick, lively, brave'.

=== Mis-spellings ===
The name is also found in a couple of West Saxon sources as Æsc (along with the tribal name Æscingas). Insley interprets these spellings as etymologically incorrect attempts by later Old English-speakers to update the then unfamiliar word Oisc into their variety of the language, influenced by the familiar name-element Æsc-. An early modern transcription of the early medieval manuscript London, British Library, Cotton Otho B. xi by Laurence Nowell gives not the name Oeric and Oisc as found in Bede, but ósric and oese, but Insley concluded that these are merely inaccurate transcriptions.

== Portrayal in the early sources ==
Little is known about Oisc, and the information that does survive regarding his life is often vague and suspect.

Anglo-Saxon king-lists generally present Oisc as the son or the grandson of Hengest, who according to other sources led the initial Anglo-Saxon conquest and settlement of Kent.

According to Bede's Ecclesiastical History of the English People, Oisc's given name was Oeric. Bede indicates that he was the son of Hengest and travelled to Britain with him, with the permission of the British king Vortigern. He was the father of Octa, who succeeded him. His descendants called themselves "Oiscingas" after him.

The Anglo-Saxon Chronicle, which in its present form was compiled by people who knew Bede's account, portrays Oisc as ruling 488–512CE.

=== Possible portrayal in the Ravenna Cosmography ===
Oisc has been widely viewed the same person as one Ansehis, who is described as a leader of the Saxon invaders of Britain in the Ravenna Cosmography. This says that "in oceano vero occidentale est insula quae dicitur Britania, ubi olim gens Saxonum veniens ab antiqua Saxonia cum principe suo nomine Ansehis modo habitare videtur" (indeed in the western ocean is an island which is called Britania, which the people of the Saxons, coming from Old Saxony under their chief, named Ansehis, seem now to inhabit". Ansehis (or, as some manuscripts have it, Ansehys) is plausibly an error for Anschis, which would be a plausible archaic or Continental Germanic form of Oisc's name. However, Insley has argued that an older idea, that Anschis would also be a plausible attempt to represent proto-Old English *Hangista-, is more plausible, and that it is Hengest whom the Ravenna Cosmography represents.

== See also ==
- List of monarchs of Kent

Regnal titles
Preceded by Hengest	King of Kent; 488–512/516	Succeeded by Octa
