= 585 =

Calendar year

585 in various calendars
- Gregorian calendar: 585; DLXXXV
- Ab urbe condita: 1338
- Armenian calendar: 34; ԹՎ ԼԴ
- Assyrian calendar: 5335
- Balinese saka calendar: 506–507
- Bengali calendar: −9 – −8
- Berber calendar: 1535
- Buddhist calendar: 1129
- Burmese calendar: −53
- Byzantine calendar: 6093–6094
- Chinese calendar: 甲辰年 (Wood Dragon); 3282 or 3075 — to — 乙巳年 (Wood Snake); 3283 or 3076
- Coptic calendar: 301–302
- Discordian calendar: 1751
- Ethiopian calendar: 577–578
- Hebrew calendar: 4345–4346
- Hindu calendars
- Vikram Samvat: 641–642
- Shaka Samvat: 506–507
- Kali Yuga: 3685–3686
- Holocene calendar: 10585
- Iranian calendar: 37 BP – 36 BP
- Islamic calendar: 38 BH – 37 BH
- Javanese calendar: 474–475
- Julian calendar: 585; DLXXXV
- Korean calendar: 2918
- Minguo calendar: 1327 before ROC 民前1327年
- Nanakshahi calendar: −883
- Seleucid era: 896/897 AG
- Thai solar calendar: 1127–1128
- Tibetan calendar: ཤིང་ཕོ་འབྲུག་ལོ་ (male Wood-Dragon); 711 or 330 or −442 — to — ཤིང་མོ་སྦྲུལ་ལོ་ (female Wood-Snake); 712 or 331 or −441

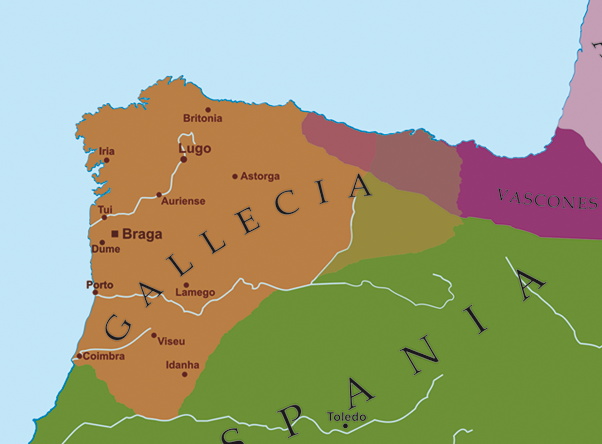
The Suevic Kingdom in Gallaecia (6th century)

Year 585 (DLXXXV) was a common year starting on Monday of the Julian calendar. The denomination 585 for this year has been used since the early medieval period, when the Anno Domini calendar era became the prevalent method in Europe for naming years.

== Events ==
=== By place ===
==== Europe ====
- King Childebert II, age 15, takes up his sole rule of Austrasia. A Frankish army under King Guntram marches to Comminges (Pyrenees), and besieges the citadel of Saint-Bertrand.
- July – Gundoald, Merovingian usurper king, and his followers are defeated during the siege of Saint-Bertrand. He is executed and Guntram stages a triumphal entry into Orléans.
- The Visigoths under King Liuvigild devastate the Suevic Kingdom in Gallaecia (northwest Spain).

==== Persia ====
- The Persian commander, Kardarigan ("black hawk"), begins an unsuccessful siege of Monokarton (modern Turkey).

==== Britain ====
- Hussa succeeds his brother Frithuwald as king of Bernicia (approximate date).
- Creoda becomes king of Mercia (according to the Anglo-Saxon Chronicle).

==== Asia ====
- September 15 – Emperor Bidatsu, age 47, dies of smallpox after a 13-year reign, and is succeeded by his brother Yōmei as the 31st emperor of Japan.
- Emperor Xiao Jing Di succeeds his father Xiao Ming Di as ruler of the Liang dynasty (China).

=== By topic ===
==== Religion ====
- King Wideok of Baekje (Korea) sends an official escort (bearing tribute), along with a master of Buddhist meditation, a reciter of Buddhist magic spells, a temple architect, and a sculptor of Buddhist images, to the Chinese court of the Sui dynasty (approximate date).
- The Armenian bishop Kardutsat goes with 7 priests, on a missionary trip to the steppes north of the Caucasus. He succeeds in baptizing many Huns and in translating books into their language.
- Columbanus, Irish missionary, gathers 12 companions for his journey to Britain, probably to the Scottish coast. After a short time, he crosses the English Channel and lands in Brittany (France).
- Zhiyi, Chinese monk, returns to the city of Jinling, where he completes his commentarial works on the Lotus Sutra.

== Births ==
- Du Ruhui, chancellor of the Tang dynasty (d. 630)
- Edwin of Northumbria, king of Deira and Bernicia (d. 633)
- Goar of Aquitaine, priest and hermit (approximate date)
- Yang Jian, imperial prince of the Sui dynasty (d. 618)
- Yuchi Gong, general of the Tang dynasty (d. 658)
- Khalid Ibn Al-Walid, general of the rashidun Caliphate (d. 642)

== Deaths ==
- April 13 – Hermenegild, Visigothic prince (or 586)
- September 14 – Bidatsu, emperor of Japan (b. 538)
- Cassiodorus, Roman statesman and writer (approximate date)
- Frithuwald, king of Bernicia (approximate date)
- Gundoald, Merovingian usurper king (approximate date)
- John of Ephesus, Armenian bishop (approximate date)
- Rigunth, daughter of Chilperic I (b. 570)
- Xiao Ming Di, emperor of the Liang dynasty (b. 542)
