= 576 =

Calendar year

576 in various calendars
Gregorian calendar	576; DLXXVI
Ab urbe condita	1329
Armenian calendar	25; ԹՎ ԻԵ
Assyrian calendar	5326
Balinese saka calendar	497–498
Bengali calendar	−18 – −17
Berber calendar	1526
Buddhist calendar	1120
Burmese calendar	−62
Byzantine calendar	6084–6085
Chinese calendar	乙未年 (Wood Goat); 3273 or 3066 — to — 丙申年 (Fire Monkey); 3274 or 3067
Coptic calendar	292–293
Discordian calendar	1742
Ethiopian calendar	568–569
Hebrew calendar	4336–4337
- Hindu calendars
Vikram Samvat	632–633
Shaka Samvat	497–498
Kali Yuga	3676–3677
Holocene calendar	10576
Iranian calendar	46 BP – 45 BP
Islamic calendar	47 BH – 46 BH
Javanese calendar	464–465
Julian calendar	576; DLXXVI
Korean calendar	2909
Minguo calendar	1336 before ROC 民前1336年
Nanakshahi calendar	−892
Seleucid era	887/888 AG
Thai solar calendar	1118–1119
Tibetan calendar	ཤིང་མོ་ལུག་ལོ་ (female Wood-Sheep); 702 or 321 or −451 — to — མེ་ཕོ་སྤྲེ་ལོ་ (male Fire-Monkey); 703 or 322 or −450

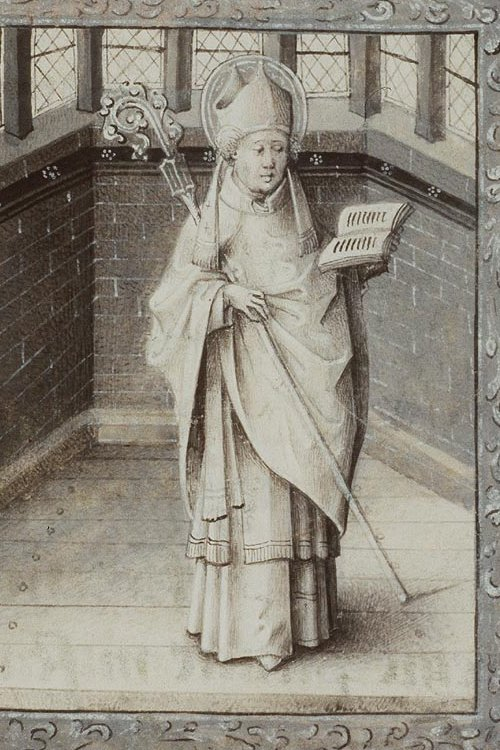
Germain of Paris (c. 496–576)

Year 576 (DLXXVI) was a leap year starting on Wednesday of the Julian calendar. The denomination 576 for this year has been used since the early medieval period, when the Anno Domini calendar era became the prevalent method in Europe for naming years.

== Events ==
=== By place ===
==== Byzantine Empire ====
- Byzantine–Sassanid War: A Persian army under King Khosrau I breaks through the Caucasus into Anatolia (modern Turkey). They attack the cities of Theodosiopolis and Caesarea, but are thwarted. Khosrau is forced to retreat and sacks Sebasteia. On the way home, he is intercepted by a Byzantine force under Justinian (magister militum of the East), and severely defeated near Melitene. The royal baggage is captured, and many Persians drown, while escaping across the Euphrates.

==== Europe ====
- Baduarius, son-in-law of the Byzantine emperor Justin II, is sent to Italy to resist the Lombard conquest. He leads an aborted counter-assault against the Lombards and dies soon after.
- The Visigoths under King Liuvigild establish the capital of their kingdom in Toledo, located in central Spain (approximate date).

==== Asia ====
- The Göktürks under Tardu cross the Cimmerian Bosporus into the Crimea, and besiege the city of Panticapaeum (Ukraine).
- Jinji becomes king of the Korean kingdom of Silla.

== Births ==
- Abu Ayyub al-Ansari, friend of Muhammad (approximate date)
- Gao Shilian, chancellor of the Tang dynasty (d. 647)

== Deaths ==
- May 28 – Saint Germain, bishop of Paris
- Baduarius, Byzantine aristocrat (approximate date)
