= 611 =

Calendar year

611 in various calendars
Gregorian calendar	611; DCXI
Ab urbe condita	1364
Armenian calendar	60; ԹՎ Կ
Assyrian calendar	5361
Balinese saka calendar	532–533
Bengali calendar	17–18
Berber calendar	1561
Buddhist calendar	1155
Burmese calendar	−27
Byzantine calendar	6119–6120
Chinese calendar	庚午年 (Metal Horse); 3308 or 3101 — to — 辛未年 (Metal Goat); 3309 or 3102
Coptic calendar	327–328
Discordian calendar	1777
Ethiopian calendar	603–604
Hebrew calendar	4371–4372
- Hindu calendars
Vikram Samvat	667–668
Shaka Samvat	532–533
Kali Yuga	3711–3712
Holocene calendar	10611
Iranian calendar	11 BP – 10 BP
Islamic calendar	11 BH – 10 BH
Japanese calendar	N/A
Javanese calendar	501–502
Julian calendar	611; DCXI
Korean calendar	2944
Minguo calendar	1301 before ROC 民前1301年
Nanakshahi calendar	−857
Seleucid era	922/923 AG
Thai solar calendar	1153–1154
Tibetan calendar	ལྕགས་ཕོ་རྟ་ལོ་ (male Iron-Horse); 737 or 356 or −416 — to — ལྕགས་མོ་ལུག་ལོ་ (female Iron-Sheep); 738 or 357 or −415

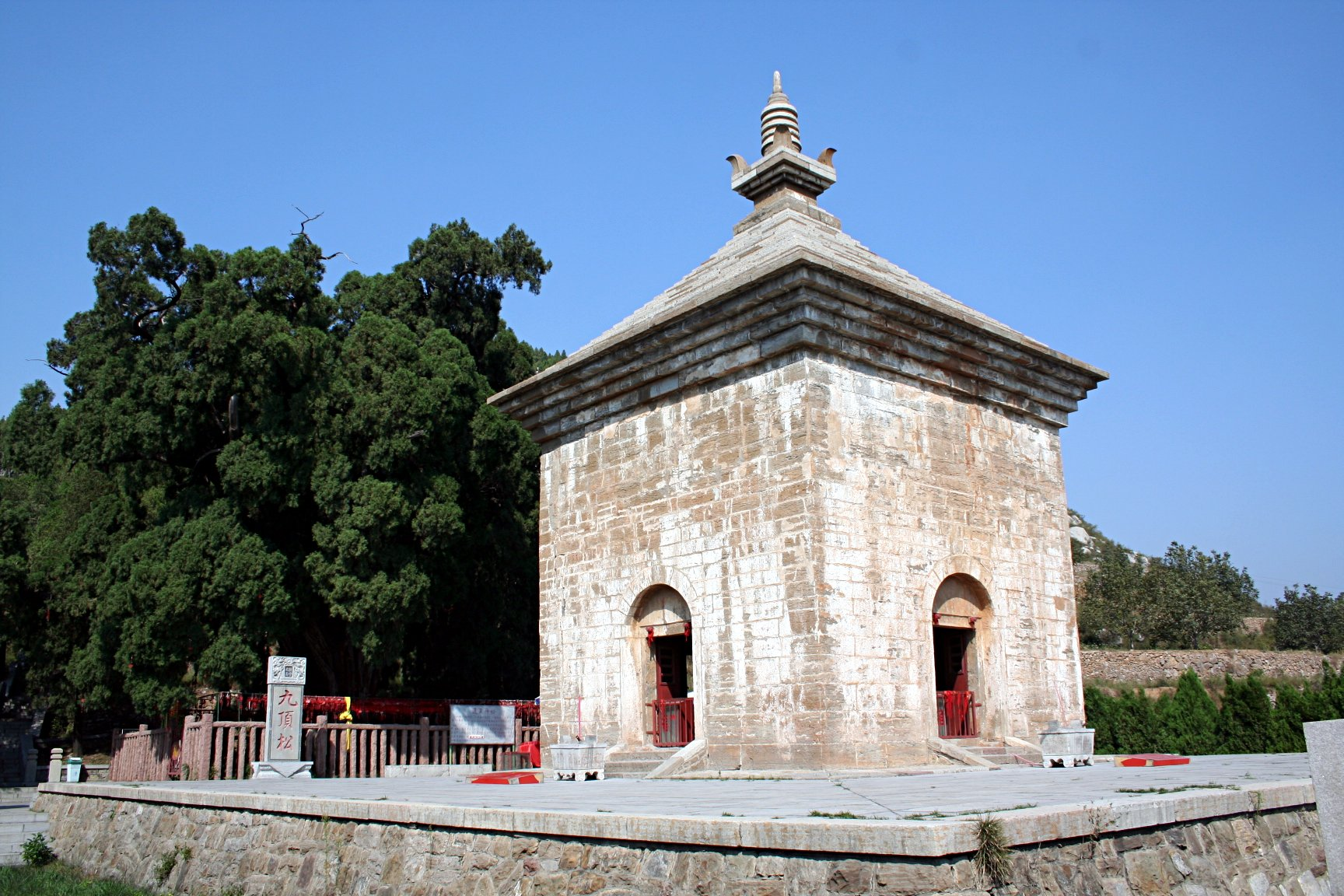
The Four Gates Pagoda (China)

Year 611 (DCXI) was a common year starting on Friday of the Julian calendar. The denomination 611 for this year has been used since the early medieval period, when the Anno Domini calendar era became the prevalent method in Europe for naming years.

== Events ==
=== By place ===
==== Persian Empire ====
- Byzantine–Persian War: The Persian army under Shahrbaraz captures Antioch, and most of the remaining Byzantine fortresses in Syria and Mesopotamia. King Khosrau II is re-establishing a neo-Persian Empire, and intensifies his war effort. The Byzantine army, ruined by defeat and corruption, offers only half-hearted opposition.

==== Britain ====
- Cynegils becomes king of the West Saxons, or Wessex, after the death of his uncle Ceolwulf (according to the Anglo-Saxon Chronicle). He rules from 611 to 643 and shares power to some extent with his eldest son, Cwichelm, who may have been given Upper Wessex (approximate date).

=== By topic ===
==== Religion ====
- The Four Gates Pagoda, located in central Shandong Province (East China), is completed.

== Births ==
- July 7 – Eudoxia Epiphania, daughter of Byzantine emperor Heraclius
- Leo II, Pope of the Catholic Church (d. 683)

== Deaths ==
- Arnoald, Bishop of Metz (approximate date)
- Ceolwulf, king of Wessex (approximate date)
- Comentiolus, Byzantine general (approximate date)
- Romilda of Friuli, regent duchess of Friuli (approximate date)
