= 542 Sea of Marmara earthquake =

The 542 Sea of Marmara earthquake took place in the winter of 542 in the vicinity of the Sea of Marmara. It also affected the coasts of Thrace and the Edremit Gulf. The earthquake affected the eastern Roman empire during the reign of the emperor Justinian I.

According to the historian George Kedrenos (11th century), this earthquake is associated with a seismic sea wave (tsunami) which flooded the coasts of Thrace. The cities of Aphrodesion, (Note: Possibly Aphrodisias (Thrace), which was situated on the Thracian Chersonese and therefore in a plausible location.) Dionysioupolis, and Odessa (modern Varna) were reportedly flooded, alongside other settlements of the Gulf of Adramyttium (the Edremit Gulf). According to Kedrenos' description, the sea advanced about 4 mi (6.4 km) inland. Before retreating to its previous position, the sea drowned many people, and caused heavy damage to the affected land areas.

The same event is described by the historian Michael Glykas (12th century), who mentions that the event coincided with an outbreak of pestilence in Constantinople. The pestilence was likely the so-called Plague of Justinian. Glykas' dating places the earthquake and tsunami between September 542 and January 543.

Kedrenos and Glykas mention the tsunami, but not the earthquake. The earthquake is instead recorded by the historian Theophanes the Confessor (9th century) and mentioned in a different narrative of Kedrenos. Based on their description, the earthquake devastated Cyzicus (modern Bandırma) and damaged Constantinople. This earthquake is dated to September 542.

The closeness of the two events makes it probable that the tsunami was caused by the recorded earthquake. Another earthquake which is reported to have damaged Constantinople in 542 may instead be a different reference to the same event. If not, two or more earthquakes may have occurred within a short time span. This would indicate an activation of seismic activity in the Sea of Marmara.

== Sources ==
- Antonopoulos, J. (1980), Data from investigation of seismic Sea waves events in the Eastern Mediterranean from 500 to 1000 A.D., Annals of Geophysics
