= Octa of Kent =

King of the Anglo-Saxon Kingdom of Kent

Octa (or Octha) (c. 500 – c. 543) was an Anglo-Saxon King of Kent during the 6th century. Sources disagree on his relationship to the other kings in his line; he may have been the son of Hengist or Oisc, and may have been the father of Oisc or Eormenric. The dates of his reign are unclear, but he may have ruled from 512 to 534 or from 516 to 540. Despite his shadowy recorded history Octa made an impact on the Britons, who describe his deeds in several sources. He appears in Geoffrey of Monmouth's Historia Regum Britanniae, in which he battles the kings Aurelius Ambrosius and Uther Pendragon.

== Sources ==
The 9th-century Anglo-Saxon Chronicle, one of the most important sources for this period of history, does not mention Octa. It does, however, mention Hengist and gives Oisc as his son. However, Bede's Ecclesiastical History of the English People, completed around 731, names Octa as the son of "Orric, surnamed Oisc" and the grandson of Hengist. Conversely, the 9th-century Cotton Vespasian manuscript indicates that Octa was the son of Hengist and the father of Oisc.

Octa also appears in the Historia Brittonum, a 9th-century history of the Britons. According to the narrative, Hengist, who had settled in Britain with the consent of the British king Vortigern as defence against the Scots, sends for his sons Octa and Ebusa to supplement his forces. Octa and Ebusa subsequently raid Scotland. After Hengist's death Octa becomes king of Kent. Some manuscripts of the Historia include genealogies of the Saxon kingdoms; the genealogy of the kings of Kent names Octa as the son and successor to Hengist and the father to the subsequent king Ossa.

== In literature ==
Octa appears in Geoffrey of Monmouth's 12th-century pseudohistory Historia Regum Britanniae. The earlier scenes featuring him are taken directly from the Historia Brittonum, while the later scenes have no known source, and were likely invented by Geoffrey. As in the Historia Brittonum, Octa is brought to Britain by his father with Vortigern's consent. Later, Vortigern is deposed by the rightful King of the Britons, Aurelius Ambrosius (the historical Ambrosius Aurelianus) and Hengist is captured and later executed. Octa leads his men to York and continues to harry the Britons, along with his kinsman Eosa. Aurelius besieges York, and eventually Octa surrenders. He negotiates a truce in which the Saxons are allowed to stay in northern Britain as vassals to Aurelius. After the death of Aurelius, however, Octa and Eosa regard the treaty as no longer binding and resume their belligerence. The new king, Aurelius' brother Uther Pendragon, leads his armies against the Saxons and routs them in a surprise night attack. Octa and Eosa are taken prisoner, but they eventually escape and return to Germany. They return with a vast army, and Uther meets them again in a battle in which Octa and Eosa are finally slain.

Octa may appear in Welsh Arthurian literature as Osla Bigknife, though this character may be better identified with Offa of Mercia. This Osla figures in two medieval prose tales, Culhwch and Olwen (c. 1100) and The Dream of Rhonabwy (12th- or 13th-century). In Culhwch he is a member of King Arthur's retinue; he is named in a list of Arthur's followers, and his weapon "Bronllavyn Short Broad", which is wide enough for Arthur's army to use as a bridge, is described. Osla later participates in the hunt for the great boar Twrch Trwyth, during which he nearly drowns when the sheath of his great knife fills with water. In Rhonabwy Osla is Arthur's opponent at the Battle of Badon.

== Notes ==
Regnal titles
Preceded by Oisc	King of Kent; 512/516–534/540	Succeeded by Eormenric
