= 651 =

Calendar year

651 in various calendars
Gregorian calendar	651; DCLI
Ab urbe condita	1404
Armenian calendar	100; ԹՎ Ճ
Assyrian calendar	5401
Balinese saka calendar	572–573
Bengali calendar	57–58
Berber calendar	1601
Buddhist calendar	1195
Burmese calendar	13
Byzantine calendar	6159–6160
Chinese calendar	庚戌年 (Metal Dog); 3348 or 3141 — to — 辛亥年 (Metal Pig); 3349 or 3142
Coptic calendar	367–368
Discordian calendar	1817
Ethiopian calendar	643–644
Hebrew calendar	4411–4412
- Hindu calendars
Vikram Samvat	707–708
Shaka Samvat	572–573
Kali Yuga	3751–3752
Holocene calendar	10651
Iranian calendar	29–30
Islamic calendar	30–31
Japanese calendar	Hakuchi 2 (白雉２年)
Javanese calendar	542–543
Julian calendar	651; DCLI
Korean calendar	2984
Minguo calendar	1261 before ROC 民前1261年
Nanakshahi calendar	−817
Seleucid era	962/963 AG
Thai solar calendar	1193–1194
Tibetan calendar	ལྕགས་ཕོ་ཁྱི་ལོ་ (male Iron-Dog); 777 or 396 or −376 — to — ལྕགས་མོ་ཕག་ལོ་ (female Iron-Boar); 778 or 397 or −375

Year 651 (DCLI) was a common year starting on Saturday of the Julian calendar. The denomination 651 for this year has been used since the early medieval period, when the Anno Domini calendar era became the prevalent method in Europe for naming years.

== Events ==
=== By place ===
==== Europe ====
- King Clovis II of Neustria and Burgundy marries Balthild, said to be an Anglo-Saxon aristocrat sold into slavery in Gaul. She has been owned by Clovis' mayor of the palace, Erchinoald, who gives her to him to garner royal favour (approximate date).

==== Britain ====
- King Oswiu of Bernicia declares war on his rival, King Oswine of Deira. Oswine refuses to engage him in battle, and retreats to Gilling (North Yorkshire). Oswine is betrayed by a friend, and murdered by Oswiu's soldiers.
- Œthelwald succeeds his uncle Oswine as king of Deira, and allies himself with Oswiu's enemy, King Penda of Mercia. Queen Eanflæd of Bernicia donates the estate of Gilling for the foundation of a monastery.

==== Persia ====
- King Yazdegerd III of Persia is murdered in a miller's hut near Merv by his followers, ending both Persian resistance to Arab conquest, and the Sassanid Empire.

==== Arabian Caliphate ====
- The Rashidun army under Abdullah ibn Aamir invades Afghanistan, and captures the main forts in Khorasan (modern Iran). The Muslim Arabs occupy the cities of Balkh and Herat, which surrender peacefully.
- An embassy led by Sa`d ibn Abi Waqqas arrives in the capital Chang'an via an oversea route. They are greeted by Emperor Gao Zong, who orders the establishment of the first Chinese mosque.
- The Quran is compiled by Caliph Uthman ibn Affan in its modern-day form. The text becomes the model from which copies are made and promulgated throughout the urban centers of the Arab world.

=== By topic ===
==== Religion ====
- The Hôtel-Dieu de Paris is founded by bishop Landry (Landericus). It becomes the first major hospital in Paris.

== Deaths ==
- August 20 – Oswine, king of Deira (England)
- August 31 – Aidan, Irish-born bishop of Lindisfarne
- Braulio, bishop of Zaragoza (b. 590)
- Dayi Daoxin, Chán Buddhist patriarch (b. 580)
- Grasulf II, duke of Friuli (approximate date)
- Radoald, duke of Benevento (Italy)
- Yazdegard III, king of the Sassanid Empire
- Apranik, Sasanian female military commander.
