= Pope Benedict I =

Head of the Catholic Church from 575 to 579

- Bishop of Rome
- Church: Catholic Church
- Papacy began: 2 June 575
- Papacy ended: 30 July 579
- Predecessor: John III
- Successor: Pelagius II

Personal details
- Born: 524 or 525? Rome, Ostrogothic Kingdom
- Died: 30 July 579 (aged 53–56) Rome, Italy, Eastern Roman Empire

Pope Benedict I (Latin: Benedictus I; died 30 July 579) was the bishop of Rome from 2 June 575 to his death on 30 July 579. His pontificate took place during the Lombard expansion in Italy and during famine in Rome and other parts of Byzantine Italy.

== Background ==
Benedict was from Rome and was the son of Boniface. He was called Bonosus by the Greeks. Nothing is known of his life before his election as pope.

== Election ==
After the death of Pope John III in July 574, there was a vacancy of nearly eleven months before Benedict was consecrated on 2 June 575. The delay was caused by the requirement that the emperor at Constantinople confirm the election of the pope before consecration, while communication between Rome and Constantinople was affected by the Lombard advance in Italy.

== Pontificate ==
The Liber Pontificalis says the Lombards invaded Italy during Benedict's pontificate and that famine caused some fortified places to surrender to them. The same source says the emperor sent ships to Egypt to bring grain to Rome; Treccani identifies the emperor as Justin II.

Around 577, the Roman patrician Pamphronius led a mission to Constantinople with 3,000 pounds of gold for the war against the Lombards. Pamphronius may have acted as head of the Roman Senate, but Benedict's role in the mission is unknown.

Benedict granted an estate, the Massa Veneris, in the territory of Minturnae, to Stephen, abbot of St. Mark's near the walls of Spoleto. The monastery had appealed to Benedict for the return of property in the territory of Minturnae that had been incorporated into the Roman Church's properties in Campania.

In a ceremony held in December, Benedict ordained fifteen priests and three deacons and consecrated twenty-one bishops.

Few records of transactions outside Rome survive from Benedict's pontificate, and few may have existed because of the disruption caused by the Lombards in Italy.

== Death and burial ==
Benedict died on 30 July 579. He was buried in the vestibule of the sacristy of Old St. Peter's Basilica.

Benedict was succeeded by Pope Pelagius II, who was consecrated on 26 November 579.

Catholic Church titles
| Preceded by John III | Pope; 575–579 | Succeeded by Pelagius II |
