= Aphrodisias (Thrace) =

Town of ancient Thrace

Coordinates: 40°32′19″N 26°50′05″E

Aphrodisias (Ancient Greek: Ἀφροδισιάς) was a town of ancient Thrace on the Thracian Chersonese, inhabited during Hellenistic, Roman, and Byzantine times. During Roman times, it received a Roman colony under the name of Colonia Flaviopolis.

Its site is located on the Gallipoli Peninsula in European Turkey.
