= Pope John III =

Head of the Catholic Church from 561 to 574

- Bishop of Rome
- Church: Catholic Church
- Papacy began: 17 July 561
- Papacy ended: 13 July 574
- Predecessor: Pelagius I
- Successor: Benedict I

Personal details
- Born: Catelinus; 520 Rome, Ostrogothic Kingdom
- Died: 13 July 574 (aged 53–54) Rome, Italy, Eastern Roman Empire

Pope John III (Latin: Ioannes III; died 13 July 574), born Catelinus, was the bishop of Rome from 17 July 561 to his death on 13 July 574.

== Family ==
Catelinus was born in Rome to a distinguished family. His father, Anastasius, was a vir illustris, a high-ranking member of the Roman Senate. He may be identical with the subdeacon John who made a collection of extracts from the Greek Fathers and completed the translation of the Vitae patrum into Latin which Pope Pelagius I had begun.

== Papacy ==
Catelinus was elected to succeed Pelagius I and was consecrated as pope on 17 July 561. He took the name John on his accession to the papacy.

John's pontificate is characterized by two major events over which he had no control. The first was the death of Emperor Justinian I in 565, after which the Eastern Roman Empire turned its attention from Rome and the rest of Italy to pressing problems in the Balkans, from the Avars, Persians and the Arabs. The other major event was the Lombard invasion of Italy, which began in 568. Much of northern Italy was overrun, as well as the central spine of the peninsula, making a shambles of the imperial administration. The Lombards threatened the survival of Rome itself, besieging it repeatedly. Their entrance reintroduced the Arian belief, which threatened the predominance of Trinitarian Christianity.

As the Lombards poured south into Italy, the newly appointed governor Longinus sat powerless in Ravenna, unable to stop them. Pope John took it upon himself to go to Naples, where the former governor Narses was preparing to return to the imperial capital, Constantinople, and beg him to take charge. He had been recalled by the new emperor, Justin II, in response to Italian petitions over his oppressive taxation. Narses agreed to this, and returned to Rome. However, popular hatred of Narses was then extended to John for inviting him back. This unrest reached such a pitch that the pope was forced to retire from Rome and take up residence at the catacombs along the Via Appia two miles outside the city. There he carried out his duties, including the consecration of bishops.

One recorded act of Pope John involved two bishops, Salonius of Embrun and Sagittarius of Gap, who had been condemned in a synod at Lyons (c. 567). This pair succeeded in persuading King Guntram of Burgundy that they had been condemned unjustly, and appealed to the pope. Influenced by Guntram's letters, John decided that they should be restored to their sees.

John III died on 13 July 574 and was succeeded by Benedict I.

Catholic Church titles
| Preceded by Pelagius I | Pope; 561–574 | Succeeded by Benedict I |
