= 521 =

Calendar year

521 in various calendars
Gregorian calendar	521; DXXI
Ab urbe condita	1274
Assyrian calendar	5271
Balinese saka calendar	442–443
Bengali calendar	−73 – −72
Berber calendar	1471
Buddhist calendar	1065
Burmese calendar	−117
Byzantine calendar	6029–6030
Chinese calendar	庚子年 (Metal Rat); 3218 or 3011 — to — 辛丑年 (Metal Ox); 3219 or 3012
Coptic calendar	237–238
Discordian calendar	1687
Ethiopian calendar	513–514
Hebrew calendar	4281–4282
- Hindu calendars
Vikram Samvat	577–578
Shaka Samvat	442–443
Kali Yuga	3621–3622
Holocene calendar	10521
Iranian calendar	101 BP – 100 BP
Islamic calendar	104 BH – 103 BH
Javanese calendar	408–409
Julian calendar	521; DXXI
Korean calendar	2854
Minguo calendar	1391 before ROC 民前1391年
Nanakshahi calendar	−947
Seleucid era	832/833 AG
Thai solar calendar	1063–1064
Tibetan calendar	ལྕགས་ཕོ་བྱི་བ་ལོ་ (male Iron-Rat); 647 or 266 or −506 — to — ལྕགས་མོ་གླང་ལོ་ (female Iron-Ox); 648 or 267 or −505

Year 521 (DXXI) was a common year starting on Friday of the Julian calendar. At the time, it was known as the Year of the Consulship of Sabbatius and Valerius (or, less frequently, year 1274 Ab urbe condita). The denomination 521 for this year has been used since the early medieval period, when the Anno Domini calendar era became the prevalent method in Europe for naming years.

== Events ==
=== By place ===
==== Byzantine Empire ====
- Future Byzantine emperor Justinian, age 39, is appointed consul. He later becomes Commander-in-chief of the Army of the East.

==== Arabia ====
- Ma`adikarib Ya`fur becomes king, supported by the Aksumites; he begins a military campaign against the Arabian tribes.

=== By topic ===
==== Music ====
- Boethius introduces Greek musical letter notation to the West.

==== Religion ====
- February 22 – Samson of Dol is ordained as bishop in Brittany, on the Feast of the Chair of Saint Peter.
- Ecclesius becomes a bishop of Ravenna.

== Births ==
- December 7 – Columba, Gaelic Irish missionary monk (d. 597)
- Agericus, bishop of Verdun (approximate date)
- Gao Cheng, high official and regent of Eastern Wei (d. 549)

== Deaths ==
- July 17 – Magnus Felix Ennodius, bishop and Latin poet
- November 29 – Jacob of Serugh, Syrian poet and theologian
