= 623 =

Calendar year

623 in various calendars
- Gregorian calendar: 623; DCXXIII
- Ab urbe condita: 1376
- Armenian calendar: 72; ԹՎ ՀԲ
- Assyrian calendar: 5373
- Balinese saka calendar: 544–545
- Bengali calendar: 29–30
- Berber calendar: 1573
- Buddhist calendar: 1167
- Burmese calendar: −15
- Byzantine calendar: 6131–6132
- Chinese calendar: 壬午年 (Water Horse); 3320 or 3113 — to — 癸未年 (Water Goat); 3321 or 3114
- Coptic calendar: 339–340
- Discordian calendar: 1789
- Ethiopian calendar: 615–616
- Hebrew calendar: 4383–4384
- Hindu calendars
- Vikram Samvat: 679–680
- Shaka Samvat: 544–545
- Kali Yuga: 3723–3724
- Holocene calendar: 10623
- Iranian calendar: 1–2
- Islamic calendar: 1–2
- Japanese calendar: N/A
- Javanese calendar: 513–514
- Julian calendar: 623; DCXXIII
- Korean calendar: 2956
- Minguo calendar: 1289 before ROC 民前1289年
- Nanakshahi calendar: −845
- Seleucid era: 934/935 AG
- Thai solar calendar: 1165–1166
- Tibetan calendar: ཆུ་ཕོ་རྟ་ལོ་ (male Water-Horse); 749 or 368 or −404 — to — ཆུ་མོ་ལུག་ལོ་ (female Water-Sheep); 750 or 369 or −403

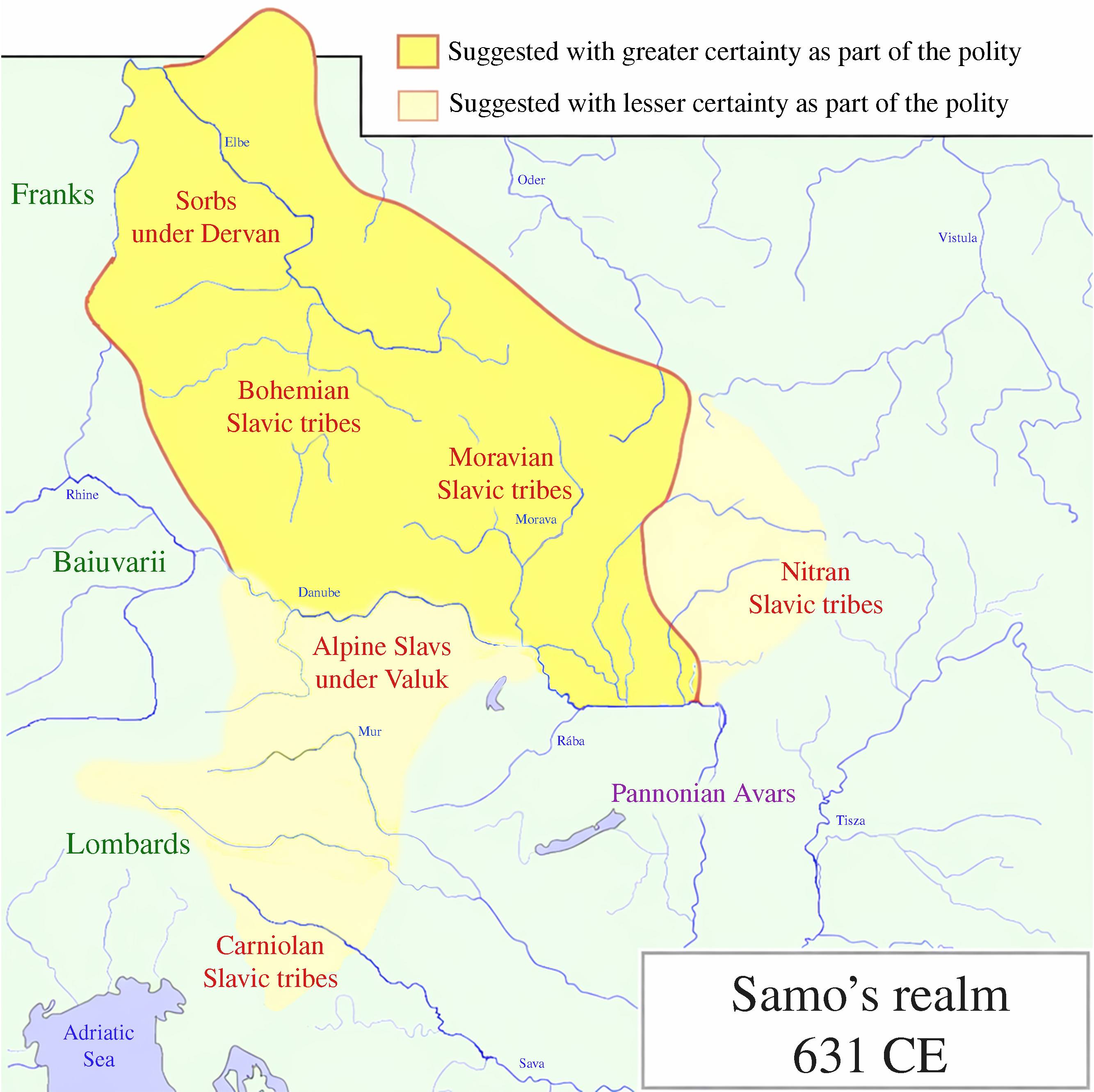
Samo's realm in 631

Year 623 (DCXXIII) was a common year starting on Saturday of the Julian calendar. The denomination 623 for this year has been used since the early medieval period, when the Anno Domini calendar era became the prevalent method in Europe for naming years.

== Events ==
=== By place ===
==== Byzantine Empire ====
- Byzantine–Sassanid War: Emperor Heraclius invades Armenia, leaving his son Constantine (age 11) and co-regent Bonus to defend Constantinople against the Persians still at Chalcedon (modern Turkey). He sails with 5,000 reinforcements to join the Byzantine army at Trapezus. Raising additional forces in Pontus, Heraclius strikes through the mountains of Armenia and the northern sub-Caucasian principalities. He plunders Media (Azerbaijan), and avoids the Persian armies who attempt to trap him.

==== Europe ====
- King Clothar II gives Austrasia to his son Dagobert I, age 20, effectively granting the kingdom semi-autonomy in repayment for the support of its nobles, most notably Pepin of Landen (Mayor of the Palace), and in recognition of calls from the Austrasians for a king of their own. Arnulf, bishop of Metz, becomes advisor to Dagobert.
- Samo, reputedly a Frankish merchant, is elected king of the Slavs in Moravia, Slovakia and Lower Austria. A string of victories over the Avars proves his utilitas (usefulness) to his subjects, and he secures the throne to establish his own kingdom, which stretches from the upper Elbe to the Danube.

==== Asia ====
- Tuyuhun invasion of Gansu: Tang forces under Chai Shao defeat the Tuyuhun, and prevent further incursions into Gansu (China).

=== By topic ===
==== Art ====
- Tori Busshi makes "Shaka Triad", in the kon-dō of Hōryū-ji, during the Asuka period (approximate date).

==== Religion ====
- The Jewish community in Medina (Saudi Arabia) rejects the idea of Muhammad being a leader of Judaism. He and his followers stop bowing toward Jerusalem and start bowing toward Makkah.

== Births ==
- March 28 – Marwan I, Muslim Caliph (d. 685)

== Deaths ==
- Jizang, Chinese Buddhist monk (b. 549)
- Liu Heita, rebel leader during the Tang dynasty
- Lupus of Sens, French bishop (approximate date)
- Pingyang, princess of the Tang dynasty (b. 598)
- Su Wei, high official of the Sui dynasty (b. 542)
- Xu Yuanlang, rebel leader during the Sui dynasty
