= 658 =

Calendar year

658 in various calendars
- Gregorian calendar: 658; DCLVIII
- Ab urbe condita: 1411
- Armenian calendar: 107; ԹՎ ՃԷ
- Assyrian calendar: 5408
- Balinese saka calendar: 579–580
- Bengali calendar: 64–65
- Berber calendar: 1608
- Buddhist calendar: 1202
- Burmese calendar: 20
- Byzantine calendar: 6166–6167
- Chinese calendar: 丁巳年 (Fire Snake); 3355 or 3148 — to — 戊午年 (Earth Horse); 3356 or 3149
- Coptic calendar: 374–375
- Discordian calendar: 1824
- Ethiopian calendar: 650–651
- Hebrew calendar: 4418–4419
- Hindu calendars
- Vikram Samvat: 714–715
- Shaka Samvat: 579–580
- Kali Yuga: 3758–3759
- Holocene calendar: 10658
- Iranian calendar: 36–37
- Islamic calendar: 37–38
- Japanese calendar: Hakuchi 9 (白雉９年)
- Javanese calendar: 549–550
- Julian calendar: 658; DCLVIII
- Korean calendar: 2991
- Minguo calendar: 1254 before ROC 民前1254年
- Nanakshahi calendar: −810
- Seleucid era: 969/970 AG
- Thai solar calendar: 1200–1201
- Tibetan calendar: མེ་མོ་སྦྲུལ་ལོ་ (female Fire-Snake); 784 or 403 or −369 — to — ས་ཕོ་རྟ་ལོ་ (male Earth-Horse); 785 or 404 or −368

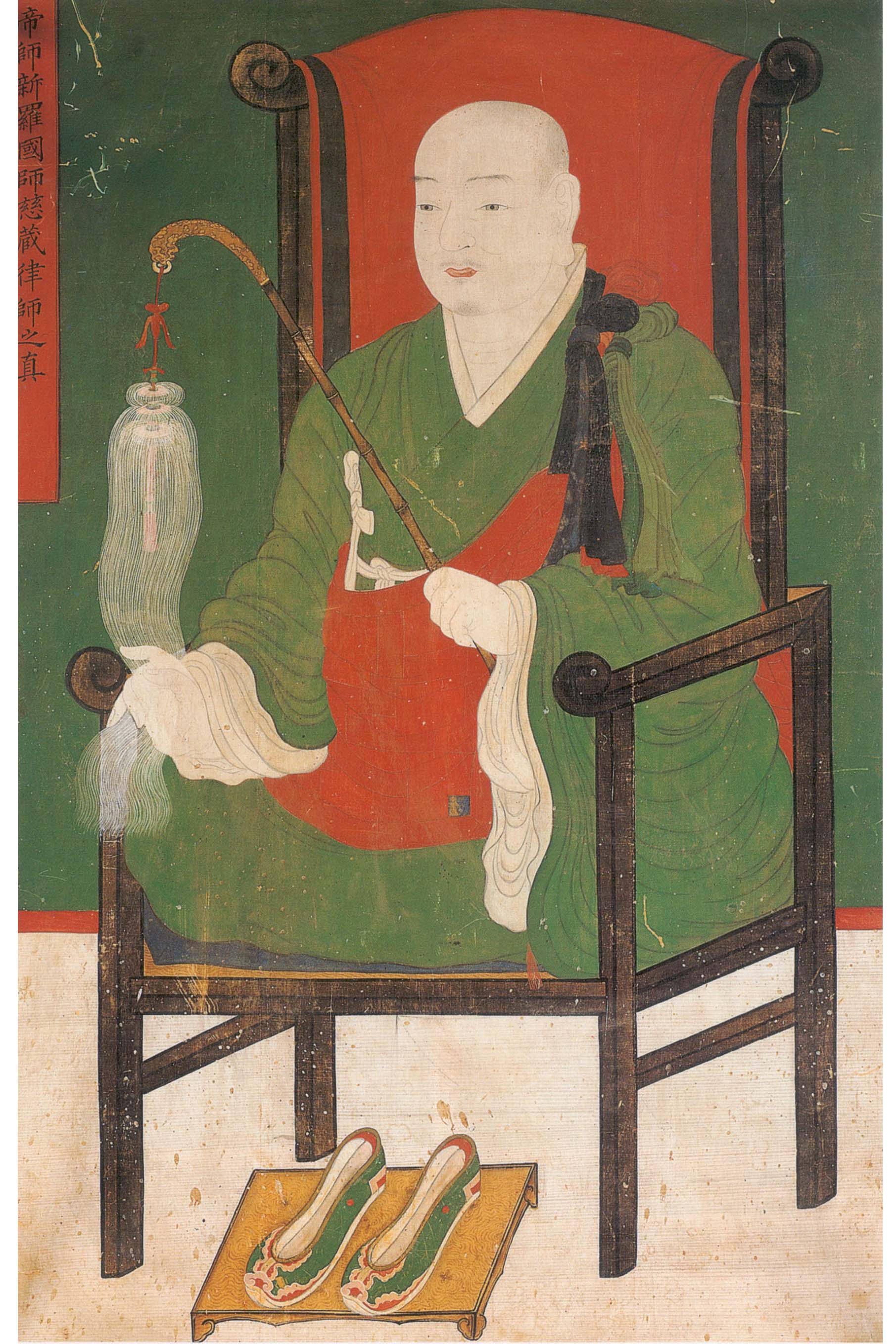
Painting of Jajang (590–658)

Year 658 (DCLVIII) was a common year starting on Monday of the Julian calendar. The denomination 658 for this year has been used since the early medieval period, when the Anno Domini calendar era became the prevalent method in Europe for naming years.

== Events ==
=== By place ===
==== Byzantine Empire ====
- Emperor Constans II undertakes an expedition to the Balkan Peninsula, and defeats the Avars in Macedonia. He temporarily reasserts Byzantine rule, and resettles some of them in Anatolia to fight against the Rashidun Caliphate (approximate date).

==== Europe ====
- The confederation of Slavic tribes falls apart after the death of King Samo. A Slav principality is formed from the kingdom's remnants in Carinthia (modern Austria), and the Avars capture most of its territory in Hungary (approximate date).

==== Britain ====
- Battle of Peonnum: King Cenwalh and the Wessex Saxons make a push against Dumnonia (South West England). They are victorious at Penselwood in Somerset, and the Dumnonia-Wessex border is set at the River Parrett (approximate date).
- A revolt led by three Mercian noblemen (Immin, Eata, and Eadberht) installs Wulfhere (son of king Penda) as ruler of Mercia, and drives out the supporters of King Oswiu of Northumbria.

==== Asia ====
- The Chinese Buddhist monks Zhi Yu and Zhi You recreate several south-pointing chariots, for the Japanese prince Tenji. This is a 3rd-century device made by Ma Jun, and acts as a mechanical-driven directional-compass vehicle (according to the Nihon Shoki).
- Chinese forces defeat the Western Turkic Kaganate (Central Asia). The West kaganate becomes a vassal of the Tang dynasty. During the power vacuum, Turgesh tribes emerge as the leading power (approximate date).

==== Rashiduin Caliphate ====
- April: Amr ibn al-As and Abu Musa al-Ashari conclude the arbitration agreement that ended the Battle of Siffin the previous year, declaring Caliph Ali deposed and declaring Muawiyah as the legitimate Caliph. This badly damages Ali's standing among the Caliphate, and paves the way for the end of the First Fitna.
- July: Taking advantage of the internal strife befalling Caliph Ali's faction as a result of the arbitration verdict and the Kharijite uprising, Amr ibn al-As enters Egypt with a Syrian army and reclaims the province that he had previously led thirteen years prior, proclaiming himself governor with Muawiyah's agreement. The Egyptian governor appointed by Ali, Muhammad ibn abi Bakr, under pressure due to many of the Muslim soldiers now seeing Muawiyah as the legitimate Caliph, and Amr's high popularity, surrenders the province without bloodshed, depriving Ali of the richest province of the Caliphate, and further undermining his position. Abi Bakr is later killed against Amr's orders, either on Muawiyah's orders or by Syrian soldiers in a summary execution.
- July 17: The Battle of Nahrawan sees Caliph Ali decisively defeat a Kharijite rebellion, which marks the last fighting of the First Fitna.

== Births ==
- Willibrord, Anglo-Saxon missionary
- Al-Hajjaj ibn Yusuf, Umayyad governor and viceroy (approximate date)

== Deaths ==
- Cellach mac Máele Coba, high king of Ireland
- Chu Suiliang, chancellor of the Tang dynasty (b. 597)
- Clovis II, king of Neustria and Burgundy (or 657)
- Du Zhenglun, chancellor of the Tang dynasty
- Erchinoald, mayor of the Palace of Neustria
- Jajang, Korean Buddhist monk (b. 590)
- Judicael, high king of Domnonée
- Samo, king of the Slavs (Carinthia)
- Yuchi Gong, general of the Tang dynasty (b. 585)
