= 647 =

Calendar year

647 in various calendars
Gregorian calendar	647; DCXLVII
Ab urbe condita	1400
Armenian calendar	96; ԹՎ ՂԶ
Assyrian calendar	5397
Balinese saka calendar	568–569
Bengali calendar	53–54
Berber calendar	1597
Buddhist calendar	1191
Burmese calendar	9
Byzantine calendar	6155–6156
Chinese calendar	丙午年 (Fire Horse); 3344 or 3137 — to — 丁未年 (Fire Goat); 3345 or 3138
Coptic calendar	363–364
Discordian calendar	1813
Ethiopian calendar	639–640
Hebrew calendar	4407–4408
- Hindu calendars
Vikram Samvat	703–704
Shaka Samvat	568–569
Kali Yuga	3747–3748
Holocene calendar	10647
Iranian calendar	25–26
Islamic calendar	26–27
Japanese calendar	Taika 3 (大化３年)
Javanese calendar	538–539
Julian calendar	647; DCXLVII
Korean calendar	2980
Minguo calendar	1265 before ROC 民前1265年
Nanakshahi calendar	−821
Seleucid era	958/959 AG
Thai solar calendar	1189–1190
Tibetan calendar	མེ་ཕོ་རྟ་ལོ་ (male Fire-Horse); 773 or 392 or −380 — to — མེ་མོ་ལུག་ལོ་ (female Fire-Sheep); 774 or 393 or −379

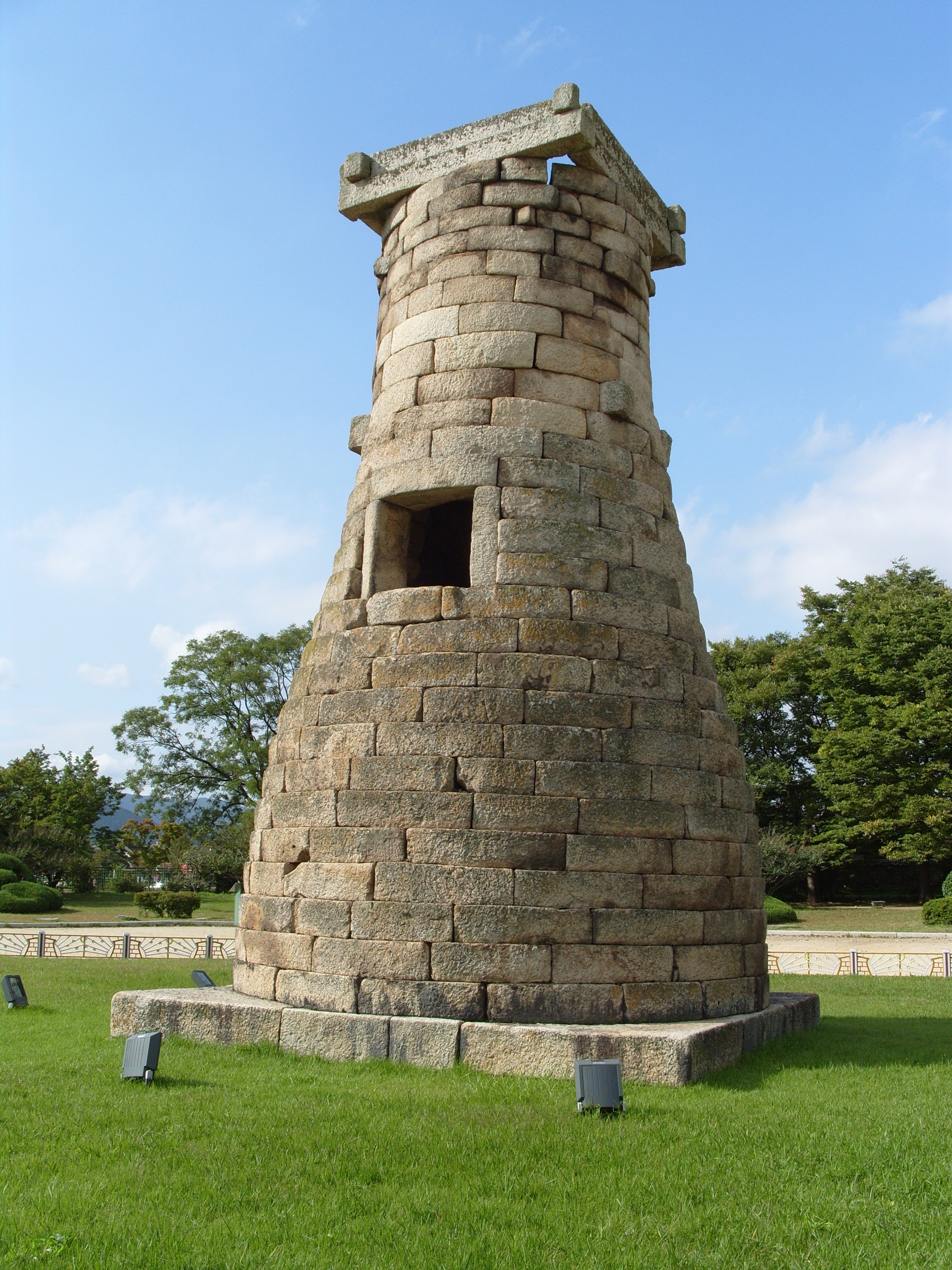
Cheomseongdae in Gyeongju (South Korea)

Year 647 (DCXLVII) was a common year starting on Monday of the Julian calendar. The denomination 647 for this year has been used since the early medieval period, when the Anno Domini calendar era became the prevalent method in Europe for naming years.

== Events ==
=== By place ===
==== Byzantine Empire ====
- Arab–Byzantine War: An Arab army (20,000 men) under Abdullah ibn Sa'ad invades the Byzantine Exarchate of Africa. It conquers Tripolitania and the city of Sufetula, 150 miles (240 km) south of Carthage.
- Self-proclaimed emperor Gregory the Patrician is killed during the Arab invasion at Sufetula. Africa returns to imperial allegiance after his death, but the foundation of Byzantine rule is fatally undermined.

==== Asia ====
- Emperor Taizong of the Tang dynasty sends a Chinese mission to study Indian techniques of sugar manufacturing, at Bihar in the Ganges Valley.
- Taizong establishes a Chinese military government to pacify the former territory of Xueyantuo, which extends to the Altai Mountains in the west.
- Emperor Harsha, ruler of northern India, dies after a 41-year reign. His kingdom disintegrates into smaller states.
- Jindeok becomes queen of the Korean kingdom of Silla after the death of Queen Seondeok.

=== By topic ===
==== Astronomy and science ====
- A stone tower astronomical observatory (named Cheomseongdae) at Gyeongju is constructed in Silla (South Korea) around this time.

==== Religion ====
- Hilda of Whitby, age 33, is persuaded by Aidan, bishop of Lindisfarne, to enter the monastic life at Hartlepool Abbey (Northumbria).

== Births ==
- Al-Abbas ibn Ali, Muslim martyr (d. 680)
- Itzamnaaj B'alam II, ruler of Yaxchilan (d. 742)

== Deaths ==
- Æthelburh of Kent, queen of Northumbria
- Felix of Burgundy, bishop of Dunwich (or 648)
- Gao Shilian, chancellor of the Tang dynasty (b. 576)
- Gregory the Patrician, Exarch of Africa
- Harsha, emperor of Harsha (India)
- Li Baiyao, Chinese official and historian (b. 564)
- Seondeok, queen of Silla (Korea)
- Xiao Yu, prince of the Liang dynasty (b. 574)
- Yang Shidao, chancellor of the Tang dynasty
