= Ermelinde =

Saint Ermelinde (born c. 546 in Lovenjoel, died 594 in Meldert, Hoegaarden), is a Brabant Saint of the 6th century. Her feast day is October 29.

== Life ==
Her parents, Ermeonoldo and Armensinda, were rich chatelains related to the Pippinids. They wanted her to marry, but she refused. Ermelinde "...cut off her hair in order to dissuade her parents from pushing her into an unwanted marriage contract". They permitted her to follow her vocation and gave her a little land. She spread her charity to the poor and lived as a hermit in a forested area, probably around Beauvechain.

Attending church at night, she had to resist the seductions of two brothers, the local lords, who being refused planned to abduct her. They agreed to take her during night prayers. Warned by an angel, Ermelinda managed to escape and left for Meldert, where she set up a hermitage and spent the rest of her life in prayer.

== Veneration ==
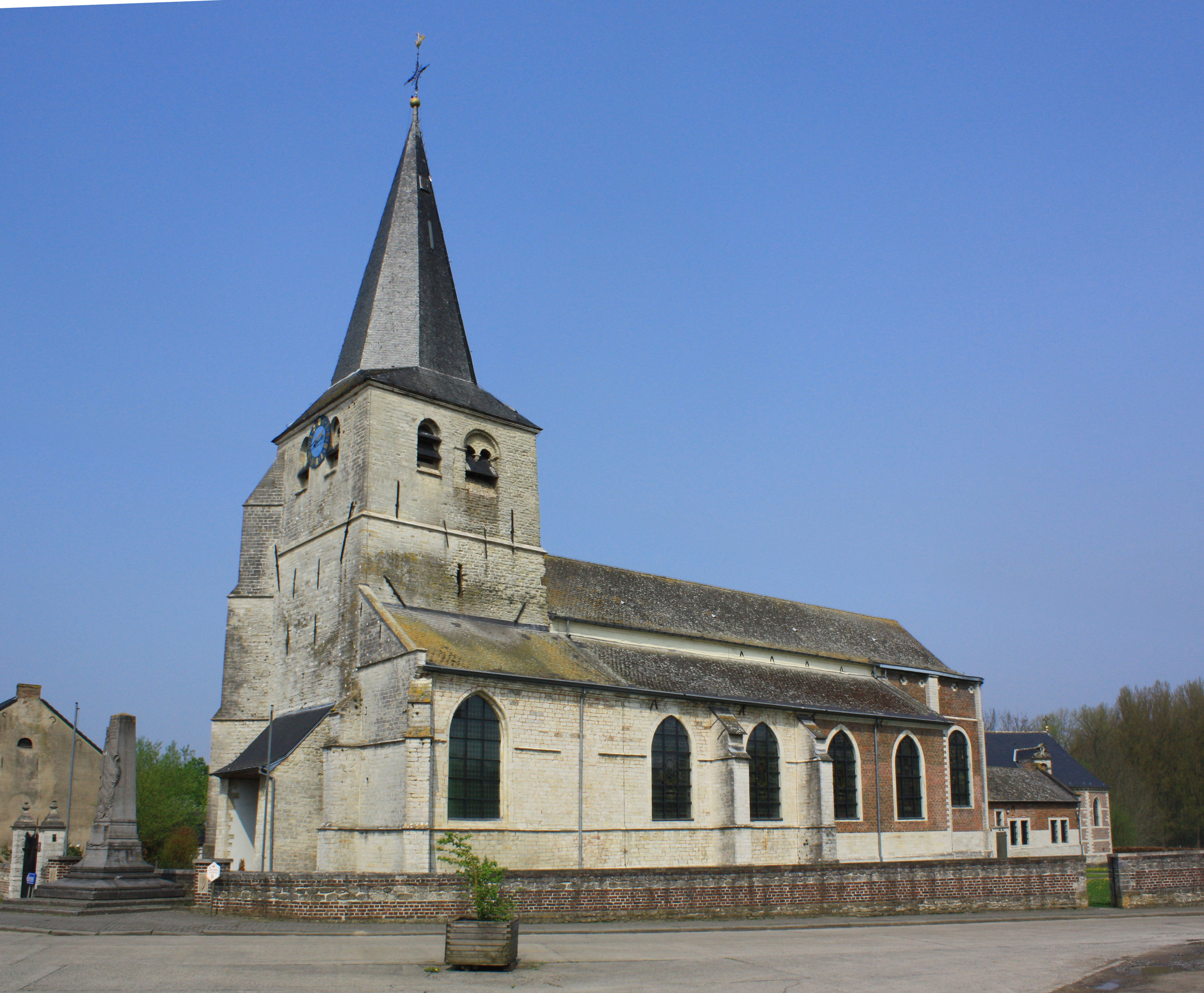
Sint-Ermelindiskerk, Meldert

She was venerated in Tirlemont and especially in Lovenjoul and Meldert. In Lovenjoul, there is a spring of water believed to be miraculous for curing the eyes, called the "Spring of St Hermelinda", because it irrigates the land belonging to her relatives.

In Meldert, her cult was very popular. The parish church of Meldert is dedicated to Saint Ermelinde and possesses a reliquary containing her relics. Every fifty years, the relics are presented in devotion to the parishioners. On the Tuesday of Pentecost, in Meldert, a procession is organised in the honour of Saint Ermelinde. The Confraternity dedicated to her still exists in this town.

She is also celebrated in the diocese of Malines on 29 October, the day traditionally considered to be the day of her death.

Saint Ermelinde is also venerated in Moergestel, in North Brabant (in the Netherlands). In 2008, in Moergestel, a Saint Ermelinde park was inaugurated.

- In the Liturgy, Saint Ermelinde is commemorated on 29 October.

She one of the saints at a chapel in Kansas, where she is considered one of the Saints for Thanksgiving. Her novena is observed November 22 through December 1. Novena Prayer: St. Ermelinda, please pray for us. You lived a simple life of prayer. Please guide us to be thankful for the blessings we have during the holiday season. (Mention Your Prayer Intention). Amen
