= Ceol of Wessex =

King of Wessex from 592 to 597

Ceol

King of Wessex
- Reign: 592–597
- Predecessor: Ceawlin
- Successor: Ceolwulf
- Died: 597
- Issue: Cynegils
- House: Wessex
- Father: Cutha (or Cuthwulf)

Ceol ([t͡ʃe͜oːl] chey-ol; also known as Ceola or Ceolric) is portrayed by the Anglo-Saxon Chronicle and West Saxon Genealogical Regnal List as King of Wessex for five to six years around 592 to 597 (the Chronicle) or 588 to 594 (the List).

== Historicity ==
David Dumville has emphasized how shaky the evidence for Ceol is. Neither the Anglo-Saxon Chronicle nor the West Saxon Genealogical Regnal List seems to be a contemporary record for the seventh century, and it is possible that Ceol was added through scribal confusion:

The monothematic name Ceol, meaning simply "ship", seems extremely implausible; in one genealogy he appears as Ceola, an apparent hypocoristic [...] implying a dithematic Ceol-name; while the Genealogical Regnal List declares Ceolwulf to be his brother, Cynegils is merely the 'son of Ceolwulf's brother', perhaps implying some uncertainty as to identity and family relationships.

== Portrayal in the Anglo-Saxon Chronicle ==
Ceol is portrayed as the son of Cutha (or Cuthwulf), the son of Cynric of Wessex, beginning his reign in 591. The Chronicle states that the following year Ceol's uncle Ceawlin was 'driven out' in a battle at "Woddesbeorg", thought to be in Wiltshire, and modern scholars have inferred that this battle was between Ceawlin and Ceol, with Ceol denying the throne to Ceawlin's son Cuthwine.

Upon Ceol's death in 597, the throne is said to pass to his brother Ceolwulf. Because his son Cynegils was presumably too young to inherit the throne, it was given to the brother, as was probably the custom among the Saxons.

== The Ceolian line ==
Ceol is portrayed as the founding member of a sub-house of the House of Wessex which would rule Wessex from 591 to 645, 648–674 and from 676 to 685, comprising Ceol, Ceolwulf, Cynegils, Cenwalh, Seaxburh and Centwine. Coenwulf and Ceolwulf I of Mercia are also claimed to be descendants of Ceol, meaning that the Ceolian line flourished for at least three centuries after its founder's death, and possibly longer. (See House of Wessex family tree.)

Regnal titles
Preceded by Ceawlin	King of Wessex; 592–597	Succeeded by Ceolwulf
