= Secundus of Trent =

Secundus of Trent or Secundus of Non authored History of the Acts of the Langobards, up to 612.

Secundus is first mentioned in the letters of Pope Gregory I for January 596, at which time Secundus served archbishop Marinianus of then-Byzantine Ravenna as deacon. In that capacity the Pope wrote to Secundus for diplomatic relations between the Lombard king Agilulf (590–616) and the Exarch.

Around 600, Secundus became an abbot and moved to Agilulf's court, where Gregory corresponded with him in 603. Secundus was godfather to prince Adaloald around that year.

== Writings ==
Secundus is best known for his history of the Lombards (Historiola). "He seems to have known much about the early Lombard leaders, but very little about how and where the Lombards were settled in Italy."

Paul the Deacon used the work for his Historia Langobardorum, especially concerning Trent and Agilulf's court.
