= 538 =

Calendar year

538 in various calendars
- Gregorian calendar: 538; DXXXVIII
- Ab urbe condita: 1291
- Assyrian calendar: 5288
- Balinese saka calendar: 459–460
- Bengali calendar: −56 – −55
- Berber calendar: 1488
- Buddhist calendar: 1082
- Burmese calendar: −100
- Byzantine calendar: 6046–6047
- Chinese calendar: 丁巳年 (Fire Snake); 3235 or 3028 — to — 戊午年 (Earth Horse); 3236 or 3029
- Coptic calendar: 254–255
- Discordian calendar: 1704
- Ethiopian calendar: 530–531
- Hebrew calendar: 4298–4299
- Hindu calendars
- Vikram Samvat: 594–595
- Shaka Samvat: 459–460
- Kali Yuga: 3638–3639
- Holocene calendar: 10538
- Iranian calendar: 84 BP – 83 BP
- Islamic calendar: 87 BH – 86 BH
- Javanese calendar: 425–426
- Julian calendar: 538; DXXXVIII
- Korean calendar: 2871
- Minguo calendar: 1374 before ROC 民前1374年
- Nanakshahi calendar: −930
- Seleucid era: 849/850 AG
- Thai solar calendar: 1080–1081
- Tibetan calendar: མེ་མོ་སྦྲུལ་ལོ་ (female Fire-Snake); 664 or 283 or −489 — to — ས་ཕོ་རྟ་ལོ་ (male Earth-Horse); 665 or 284 or −488

Year 538 (DXXXVIII) was a common year starting on Friday of the Julian calendar. At the time, it was known as the Year of the Consulship of Iohannes without colleague (or, less frequently, year 1291 Ab urbe condita). The denomination 538 for this year has been used since the early medieval period, when the Anno Domini calendar era became the prevalent method in Europe for naming years.

== Events ==
=== By place ===
==== Byzantine Empire ====
- March 12 – Siege of Rome: King Vitiges of the Ostrogoths ends his siege (after 374 days) and abandons Rome. He retreats with his Gothic army northeast along the Via Flaminia.
- Belisarius attacks the Goths when they have crossed the Milvian Bridge. After fierce resistance, Vitiges routs in panic, and many are slain or drowned in the river.
- Gothic War: Vitiges strengthens the garrisons of various towns and besieges Ariminum. Byzantine forces under the Armenian general Narses arrive at Picenum.
- April – Belisarius secures Liguria, Mediolanum (modern Milan) and Ariminum, but disagreements, especially with Narses, leads to disunity in the Byzantine army.
- Summer – King Theudebert I sends a small Frankish force across the Alps, and defeats the Goths and Byzantines at the River Po. Belisarius retreats to Tuscany.
- Sittas, Byzantine general, suppresses a revolt in Armenia in protest against heavy taxation. During the campaign he is killed by Artabanes, leader of the revolt.

==== Britain ====
- King Cuneglas of Rhos abandons his wife in favour of his sister-in-law, a nun who he drags from her convent (approximate date).
- Gabrán mac Domangairt becomes king of Dál Riata (Scotland).

==== Asia ====
- King Seong of Paekche (Korea) moves the capital from Ungjin (present-day Gongju) further south to Sabi (present-day Buyeo County), on the Geum River. He sends a diplomatic mission that formally introduces Buddhism to the Japanese imperial court (see also 552).
- The Kofun period ends and the Asuka period, the second part of the Yamato period in Japan, begins.

=== By topic ===
==== Religion ====
- As a result of persecutions by the Byzantine Empire, Monophysite Christians establish the Coptic Church in Alexandria (approximate date).
- The Third Council of Orléans takes place, and prohibits rural labor on Sunday.

==== Society ====
- Third year of worldwide famine, a consequence of the Extreme weather events of 535–536. (Note: Famine is described as "T538.1, Failure of bread" in the Annals of Tigernach.)

== Births ==
- Emperor Bidatsu of Japan (d. 585)
- Gregory of Tours, French bishop, historian (d. 594)
- Zhiyi, de facto founder of Tiantai Buddhism (d. 597)

== Deaths ==
- February 8 – Severus of Antioch, patriarch of Antioch
- Cailtram, king of the Picts (approximate date)
- Comgall mac Domangairt, king of Dál Riata (approximate date)
- Damascius, Byzantine philosopher
- Saint Manchan, Irish Saint.
- Sittas, Byzantine general (magister militum)

== Notes and references ==
=== Secondary sources ===
- Mac Niocaill, Gearóid (2010). "The Annals of Tigernach". CELT: Corpus of Electronic Texts: a project of University College Cork, College Road, Cork, Ireland.
- Martindale, John R., ed. (1992). The Prosopography of the Later Roman Empire: Volume III, AD 527–641. Cambridge: Cambridge University Press. ISBN 0-521-20160-8.
