= Egidius (bishop of Reims) =

Egidius was a nobleman from Austrasia was a bishop of Reims (573-590). An influential person during the minority of King Childebert II, he favored an alliance with Chilperic I. In 575, along with Rauching, Bertefred and others, he was one of the regents.

Many of the dukes strongly opposed the influence of Queen Brunhilda held over her son King Childebert. Three of them—Rauching, Ursio, and Berthefrid—conspired to assassinate Childebert; Egidius was suspected of involvement, but escaped prosecution much to the anger of Childebert's uncle Guntram, who had provided shelter to Brunhilda and adopted Childebert as his own son and heir.

According to Gregory of Tours, in 590, Fredegund, Queen of Soissons, encompassed the assassination of Childebert. Egidius, a known friend of Fredegund's husband King Chilperic, was asked to explain how he had come to receive a number of villas from Chilperic. The documents supposedly showing King Chilperic's authorization proved to be forged. There was also a charge of bribery. Gregory describes the trial of Egidius in 590 for treason. Faced with additional documents and witnesses, Egidius was found guilty, but his life was spared. He was defrocked and exiled to Argentoratum (Strasbourg).

== Sources ==
- Faber, Gustav. Merowingowie i Karolingowie, PWN, Warszawa 1994, p. 83.
