= Pope Pelagius II =

Head of the Catholic Church from 579 to 590

- Bishop of Rome
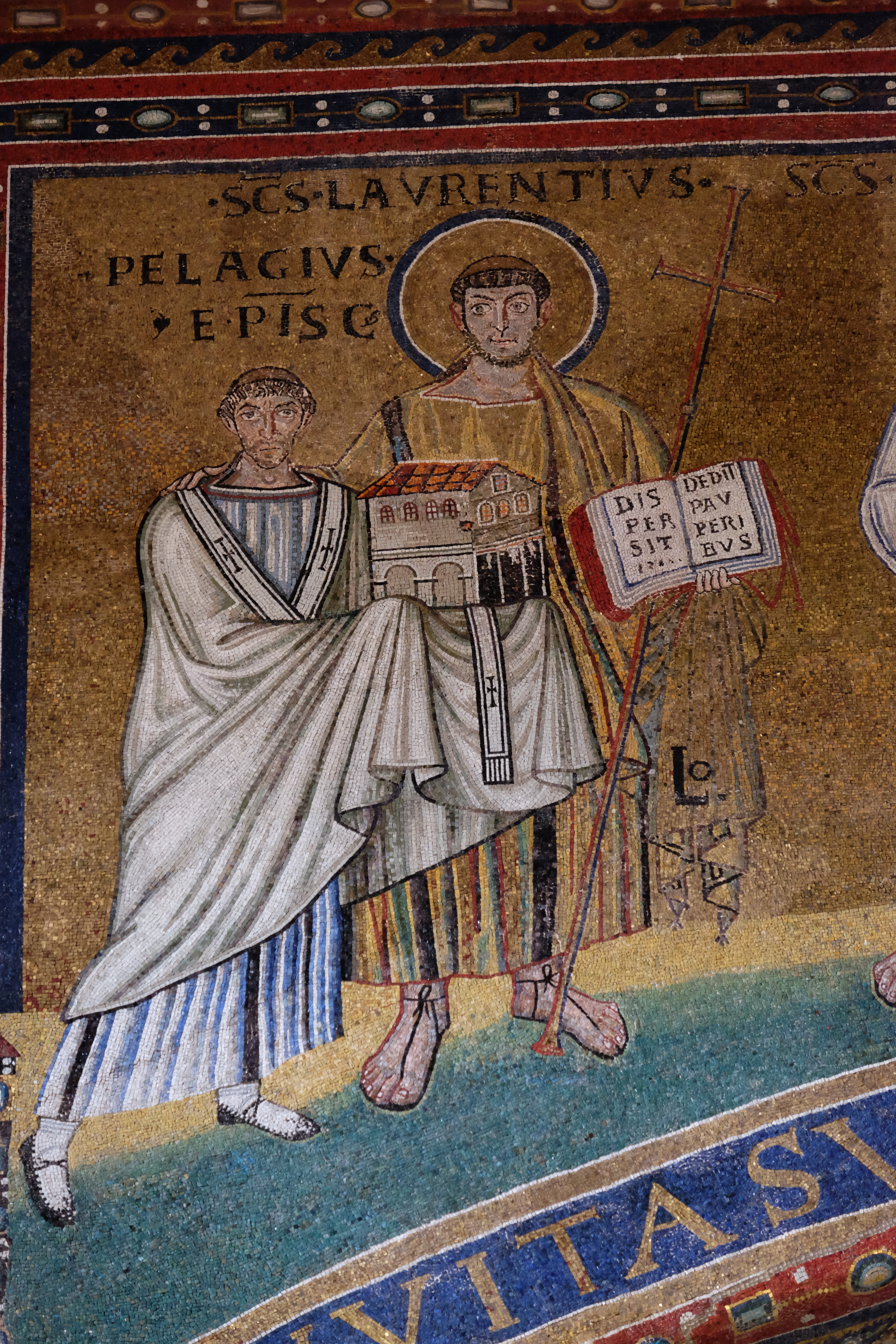
- Mosaic of Pelagius II with Saint Lawrence in San Lorenzo fuori le mura
- Church: Catholic Church
- Papacy began: 26 November 579
- Papacy ended: 7 February 590
- Predecessor: Benedict I
- Successor: Gregory I

Personal details
- Born: Before 553 Rome, Ostrogothic Kingdom
- Died: 7 February 590 Rome, Eastern Roman Empire

Pope Pelagius II (died 7 February 590) was the bishop of Rome from 26 November 579 to his death on 7 February 590.

== Life ==
Pelagius was a native of Rome, but probably of Ostrogothic descent, as his father's name was Winigild. Pelagius became Pope Benedict I's successor on 26 November 579, without imperial confirmation.

Pelagius appealed for help from Emperor Maurice against the Lombards, but to no avail, forcing Pelagius to "buy" a truce and turn to the Franks, who invaded Italy, but left after being bribed by the Lombards.

Pelagius labored to promote clerical celibacy, and he issued stringent regulations on this matter. During his pontificate, the bishop of Milan, who had broken communion with Rome in the Schism of the Three Chapters, returned to full communion around 581, while other bishops in Northern Italy remained in schism.

Pelagius ordered the construction of the Basilica di San Lorenzo fuori le Mura, a church shrine over the place where Saint Lawrence was martyred. During his reign, the Visigoths of Spain converted, but he also faced conflict with the See of Constantinople over the adoption of the title of "Ecumenical Patriarch," which Pelagius believed to undermine the authority of the papacy.

Pelagius fell victim to the plague that devastated Rome at the end of 590. His successor, Gregory I, thought his regulations of clerical celibacy too strict, and modified them to some extent.

Catholic Church titles
Preceded by Benedict I	Pope; 579–590	Succeeded by Gregory I
