= Ceolwulf of Wessex =

King of Wessex from 597 to 611

Ceolwulf

King of the West Saxons (King of the Gewisse)
- Reign: c. 597 – c. 611
- Predecessor: Ceol
- Successor: Cynegils
- Died: c. 611
- House: Wessex
- Father: Cutha (probably Cuthwulf)

Ceolwulf (died c. 611) was a king of Wessex. At that early date the West Saxons were called the Gewisse, and in his Dictionary of National Biography entry he is given the title "king of the Gewisse". According to the Anglo-Saxon Chronicle, he reigned fourteen years and the Annals of St Neots also allot him fourteen years. The West Saxon Genealogical Regnal List gives him a reign of seventeen years.

== Life ==
Ceolwulf was the son of Cutha (probably Cuthwulf) and the grandson of Cynric and succeeded his older brother Ceol. According to the Chronicle, he was a powerful ruler who "continually fought and contended either against the English, or the Britons, or the Picts, or the Scots", but it is unlikely that he fought against the Picts or the Scots. His only recorded battle was against the South Saxons in 607, perhaps for control of the Isle of Wight and south Hampshire, but he probably laid the foundations for West Saxon expansion against the British and Saxon peoples of the south and west. He may have begun to construct a regional overlordship among the groups who comprised the West Saxons.

It is not certain whether his successor, Cynegils, was his son or the son of his older brother Ceol.

== See also ==
- House of Wessex family tree

== Sources ==
- Kirby, David Peter (2000). The Earliest English Kings (revised ed.). Routledge. ISBN 0-415-24211-8.
- Yorke, Barbara (1990). Kings and Kingdoms of Early Anglo-Saxon England. Routledge. ISBN 0-415-16639-X.
- Yorke, Barbara (2004). "Ceolwulf (d. 611?), king of the Gewisse". Oxford Dictionary of National Biography. Oxford University Press. doi:10.1093/ref:odnb/57052. (subscription, Wikipedia Library access or UK public library membership required)

Regnal titles
Preceded by Ceol	Kings of Wessex; 597–611	Succeeded by Cynegils
