= Eormenric of Kent =

King of the Anglo-Saxon Kingdom of Kent

Eormenric of Kent was King of Kent from c. 534/540 to 564/580. His father may have been Octa of Kent, whom Eormenric succeeded. His son, Æthelberht of Kent, in turn succeeded him around 580/590, according to the Anglo-Saxon Chronicle. He also had a daughter named 󠁧󠁢󠁥󠁮󠁧󠁿Ricula.

Gregory of Tours records that the marriage of Æthelberht to a Frankish princess, Bertha, took place while he was filius regis (the son of the king), most likely during the reign of his father, whom the genealogies name Eormenric. Therefore, Eormenric can be regarded as the first historical King of Kent. As the date of the marriage is not known, Eormenric's reign cannot be dated. Bede placed his death in 560, but since his son's wife was not even born at that time, it seems unlikely. Rather, Gregory implies that Eormenric was still reigning as of his writing (589).

Eormenric's Frankish connection goes deeper than his daughter-in-law. The first component of his name, Eormen- was uncommon in England at the time, but common in Francia. Both Eormen- and -ric were used repeatedly in naming by the Oiscingas thereafter.

== See also ==
- List of monarchs of Kent

Regnal titles
Preceded by Octa	King of Kent; 534/540–c. 590	Succeeded by Æthelberht I
