= Synod of Caerleon =

The Synod of Caerleon may refer to either of:

- the Synod of Victory over Pelagianism presided over by St. David in Caerleon
- the Synod of Chester
