= Synod of Chester =

Ecclesiastical council of bishops in the late 6th or early 7th century

The Synod of Chester (Medieval Latin: Sinodus Urbis Legion(um)) was an ecclesiastical council of bishops held in Chester in the late 6th or early 7th century. The period is known from only a few surviving sources, so dates and accounts vary, but it seems to have been a major event in the history of Wales and England, where the native British bishops rejected overtures of peace from Augustine's English mission. This led directly to the Battle of Chester, where Æthelfrith of Northumbria seems to have killed the kings of Powys and (possibly) Gwynedd during an attack on the ecclesiastical community at Bangor-on-Dee.

== Welsh Annals ==
The Welsh annals record the entry

"The synod of Urbs Legionis [Chester]. Gregory died in Christ and also bishop David of Moni Iudeorum."

in the undated early 12th-century A text and

"The Synod of Legion City. Gregory went to Christ. David the bishop of Menevia died."

in the later B-text, which, although also undated, places it 569 years after the birth of Christ. Phillimore's reconstruction of the A text dated it to 601.

The Gregory mentioned is probably Pope Gregory I (d. 604). The David mentioned is Saint David, who was also responsible for the earlier Synod of Brefi and the Synod of Victory (over Pelagianism) which was held in the other Caerleon.

== Ecclesiastical history ==
=== Augustine's Oak ===
In his Ecclesiastical History, the English Bede devoted much of his account to the resistance of the British clergy to Victor of Aquitaine's revision of the Easter computus. The work describes two meetings between Archbishop Augustine of Canterbury and the native bishops, the first of which occurred at a place known to Bede as "Augustine's Oak". Bede locates this on the border of the Hwicci and West Saxons, which would place it just southeast of the Severn or Bristol Channel. Since he describes the men ("bishops or doctors") as coming from the "next province of the Britons" to Æthelberht, it appears that the territory of the later Hwicce had been recovered since Deorham. The Welsh may have been the Pengwern colony recorded as establishing itself in Glastonbury by the Welsh genealogies.

Augustine admonished the bishops concerning practices which had diverged from Rome, particularly the dating of Easter, and their refusal to proselytise among the pagan Angles and Saxons. Although this passes unmentioned in Bede, he presumably also insisted on his own supremacy over the churches in Britain, which would have given his protector Æthelberht a great deal of authority over the British clergy. As Bede recounts the meeting, when the Britons rejected his appeals, arguments, and demands, Augustine "put an end to this troublesome and tedious contention" by saying "'Let some infirm person be brought, and let the faith and practice of those, by whose prayers he shall be healed, be looked – upon as acceptable to God, and be adopted by all.'" A blind Briton was brought forward and, once Augustine's prayers had restored his sight to him, the British clerics "confessed that it was the true way of righteousness which Augustine taught but ... they could not depart from their ancient customs without the consent and leave of their people".

=== Second Synod ===
Augustine's second meeting was a much larger affair. Bede's records clearly stated seven bishops and "many most learned men" from the monastery at Bangor-on-Dee attended. The only certain bishoprics at the time were St. Asaph's, Menevia, Bangor, and Llandaff, so the meeting would have included not only the majority of the leaders of the British church but also close successors to Saints David, Asaph, Deiniol, and Teilo.

The Ecclesiastical History gives no detail concerning the location of this meeting. If the meeting itself was not at Chester but somewhere further south, presumably the Chester synod was the conference among the Welsh prelates beforehand to discuss how to respond to Augustine's demands and who would attend. Bede discusses this assembly, saying the Britons sought out a "holy and discreet man" who lived as a hermit among them. The hermit advised them to test Augustine: they should arrive late to the meeting and see whether he displayed the humility to rise in greeting. If so, the hermit advised them to accept him as a man of God and trustworthy in his leadership.

As it happened, Augustine did not rise from his place to meet the late-comers and the synod fell apart completely, with Augustine calling down divine vengeance upon the natives. Bede, while sympathetic enough to record the reasons for their recalcitrance, goes on to take the subsequent battle of Chester – where the Welsh kings of kingdom of Powys and Gwynedd seem to have been killed with hundreds of monks from Bangor-on-Dee – as a fulfilment of Augustine's curse and punishment for the errors of the Celtic practice: "All... through the dispensation of the Divine judgment, fell out exactly as he had predicted". Similarly, the Anglo-Saxon Chronicle does not record either the Welsh or Hwiccan gatherings of churchmen, but in its account of the battle of Chester repeats Augustine's curses and explains the battle as the fulfilment of his prophecy.

== See also ==
- Gregorian mission
- Battle of Chester
