= 545 =

Calendar year

545 in various calendars
Gregorian calendar	545; DXLV
Ab urbe condita	1298
Assyrian calendar	5295
Balinese saka calendar	466–467
Bengali calendar	−49 – −48
Berber calendar	1495
Buddhist calendar	1089
Burmese calendar	−93
Byzantine calendar	6053–6054
Chinese calendar	甲子年 (Wood Rat); 3242 or 3035 — to — 乙丑年 (Wood Ox); 3243 or 3036
Coptic calendar	261–262
Discordian calendar	1711
Ethiopian calendar	537–538
Hebrew calendar	4305–4306
- Hindu calendars
Vikram Samvat	601–602
Shaka Samvat	466–467
Kali Yuga	3645–3646
Holocene calendar	10545
Iranian calendar	77 BP – 76 BP
Islamic calendar	79 BH – 78 BH
Javanese calendar	432–434
Julian calendar	545; DXLV
Korean calendar	2878
Minguo calendar	1367 before ROC 民前1367年
Nanakshahi calendar	−923
Seleucid era	856/857 AG
Thai solar calendar	1087–1088
Tibetan calendar	ཤིང་ཕོ་བྱི་བ་ལོ་ (male Wood-Rat); 671 or 290 or −482 — to — ཤིང་མོ་གླང་ལོ་ (female Wood-Ox); 672 or 291 or −481

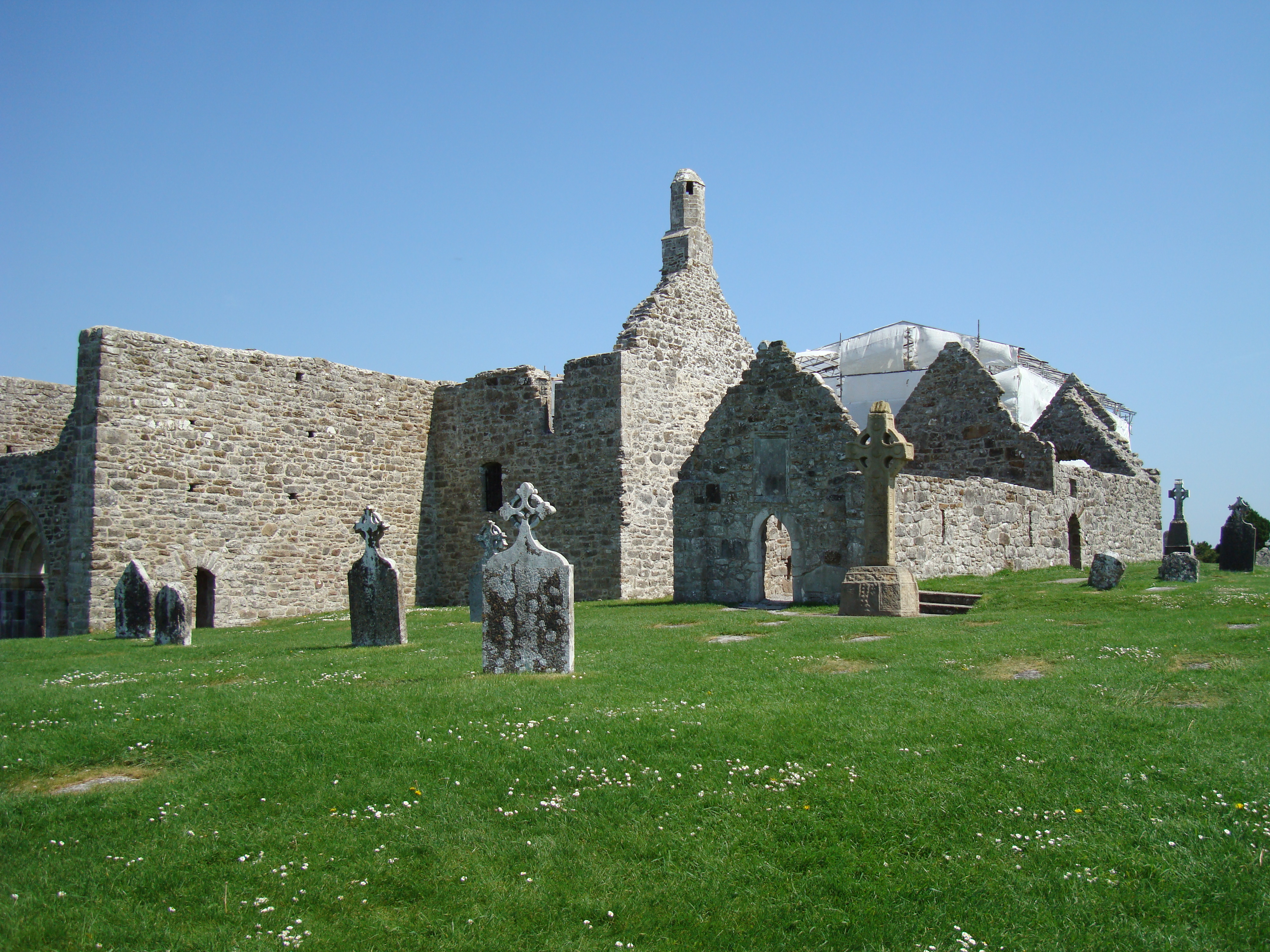
The Clonmacnoise Cathedral (Ireland)

Year 545 (DXLV) was a common year starting on Sunday of the Julian calendar. The denomination 545 for this year has been used since the early medieval period, when the Anno Domini calendar era became the prevalent method in Europe for naming years.

== Events ==
=== By place ===
==== Byzantine Empire ====
- Emperor Justinian I sends Narses, Byzantine general, to the rulers of the Heruli, to recruit troops for the campaigns in Italy and Syria.

==== Europe ====
- Gothic War: King Totila establishes his military base at Tivoli (Central Italy), and prepares a campaign to reconquer the region of Latium.
- The monastery of Clonmacnoise is founded in Ireland by Ciarán Mac a tSaor on the River Shannon (approximate date).

==== Asia ====
- Yangwon becomes ruler of the Korean kingdom of Goguryeo.

==== Persia ====
- King Khosrau I signs a five year truce with the Byzantine Empire, but war continues to ravage the Caucasus region, especially in Armenia.

=== By topic ===
==== Religion ====
- The Synod of Brefi is held at Llanddewi Brefi, to condemn the Pelagian heresy. Dubricius, archbishop of South Wales, resigns his position in favour of David (approximate date).

== Births ==
- Abd Allah ibn Abd al Muttalib, father of Muhammad (d. 570)
- Fei Di, emperor of Northern Qi (d. 561)
- Peter, Byzantine general (d. 602)

== Deaths ==
- June 3 – Clotilde, Christian wife of Clovis I and ancestress of the succeeding Merovingian dynasty (b.474)
- October 12 – Mobhí Clárainech, Irish abbot and saint
- Stotzas, Byzantine rebel leader
- Approximate date
  - Budic II, king of Brittany
  - Laurence, bishop of Sipontum
  - Medardus, bishop of Vermandois
