= 609 (disambiguation) =

609 is a year.

609 may also refer to:

- BA609: The Bell/Agusta BA609 is a civil twin-engined tiltrotor aircraft, being developed by Bell/Agusta Aerospace Company (BAAC), a joint venture between Bell Helicopters and AgustaWestland
- Area code 609
- 609 (number)
