= Adrian Monk (politician) =

British-born Falkland politician (1917–2004)

Adrian Monk OBE
- Born: 13 May 1917; Midsomer Norton, Somerset, England
- Died: 5 March 2004 (aged 86); Llanddewi Brefi, Wales
- Office: Falkland Islands Government Representative
- Spouse: Nora Smith (m. 1956)
- Children: 2
- Military career
- Allegiance: United Kingdom
- Branch: Royal Navy; Merchant Navy
- Rank: Midshipman (Navy); Chief Officer (Merchant Navy)

Adrian Monk OBE (13 May 1917 – 5 March 2004) was a British politician in the Falkland Islands, who rose to fame due to his prominent role at the time of the Falklands War. He was known as the "only real politician in the Falkland Islands".

== Life and career ==
Monk was born in Midsomer Norton, Somerset, on 13 May 1917. He was awarded the OBE in 1979.

He became a councillor on the Falkland Islands and initially rose to prominence when opposing moves by government minister Nicholas Ridley in 1980–1981 to negotiate a diplomatic solution to the contested sovereignty of the Falkland Islands. The then Governor of the islands, Sir Rex Hunt, described as "Churchillian" a Falklands radio broadcast by Monk on 2 January 1981.

After the Falklands War of 1982, Monk was elected by Falkland Islanders to be the first Falkland Islands Government Representative in the UK, a role in which he enjoyed widespread media coverage around the world. He was once referred to as the "only real politician in the Falkland Islands".

He died on 5 March 2004 in his retirement in Llanddewi Brefi, Wales.
