= Gogoyan =

Village in Ceredigion, Wales

Coordinates: 52.168591°N 3.991001°W

- Location within Ceredigion
- OS grid reference: SN 6393 5413
  - Cardiff: 58.9 mi (94.8 km)
  - London: 171.1 mi (275.4 km)
- Community: Llanddewibrefi
- Principal area: Ceredigion
- Country: Wales
- Sovereign state: United Kingdom
- Post town: Tregaron
- Postcode district: SY25
- Police: Dyfed-Powys
- Fire: Mid and West Wales
- Ambulance: Welsh
- UK Parliament: Ceredigion Preseli
- Senedd Cymru – Welsh Parliament: Ceredigion Penfro

Gogoyan (also spelt Gogoean) is a hamlet in the community of Llanddewi Brefi, Ceredigion, Wales. Until 1934 it was a civil parish, and it was also a township in the Llanddewi Brefi ecclesiastical parish.

In the hamlet is Pont Gogoyan, which is a grade II* listed bridge over the River Teifi.

== Population ==
Population of the Gogoean civil parish from 1871 to 1931.

Year	Population
1871	95
1881	88
1891	83
1901	71
1911	67
1921	76
1931	62

== See also ==
- List of localities in Wales by population
