= 561 =

Calendar year

561 in various calendars
| Gregorian calendar | 561; DLXI |
| Ab urbe condita | 1314 |
| Armenian calendar | 10; ԹՎ Ժ |
| Assyrian calendar | 5311 |
| Balinese saka calendar | 482–483 |
| Bengali calendar | −33 – −32 |
| Berber calendar | 1511 |
| Buddhist calendar | 1105 |
| Burmese calendar | −77 |
| Byzantine calendar | 6069–6070 |
| Chinese calendar | 庚辰年 (Metal Dragon); 3258 or 3051 — to — 辛巳年 (Metal Snake); 3259 or 3052 |
| Coptic calendar | 277–278 |
| Discordian calendar | 1727 |
| Ethiopian calendar | 553–554 |
| Hebrew calendar | 4321–4322 |
- Hindu calendars
| Vikram Samvat | 617–618 |
| Shaka Samvat | 482–483 |
| Kali Yuga | 3661–3662 |
| Holocene calendar | 10561 |
| Iranian calendar | 61 BP – 60 BP |
| Islamic calendar | 63 BH – 62 BH |
| Javanese calendar | 449–450 |
| Julian calendar | 561; DLXI |
| Korean calendar | 2894 |
| Minguo calendar | 1351 before ROC 民前1351年 |
| Nanakshahi calendar | −907 |
| Seleucid era | 872/873 AG |
| Thai solar calendar | 1103–1104 |
| Tibetan calendar | ལྕགས་ཕོ་འབྲུག་ལོ་ (male Iron-Dragon); 687 or 306 or −466 — to — ལྕགས་མོ་སྦྲུལ་ལོ་ (female Iron-Snake); 688 or 307 or −465 |

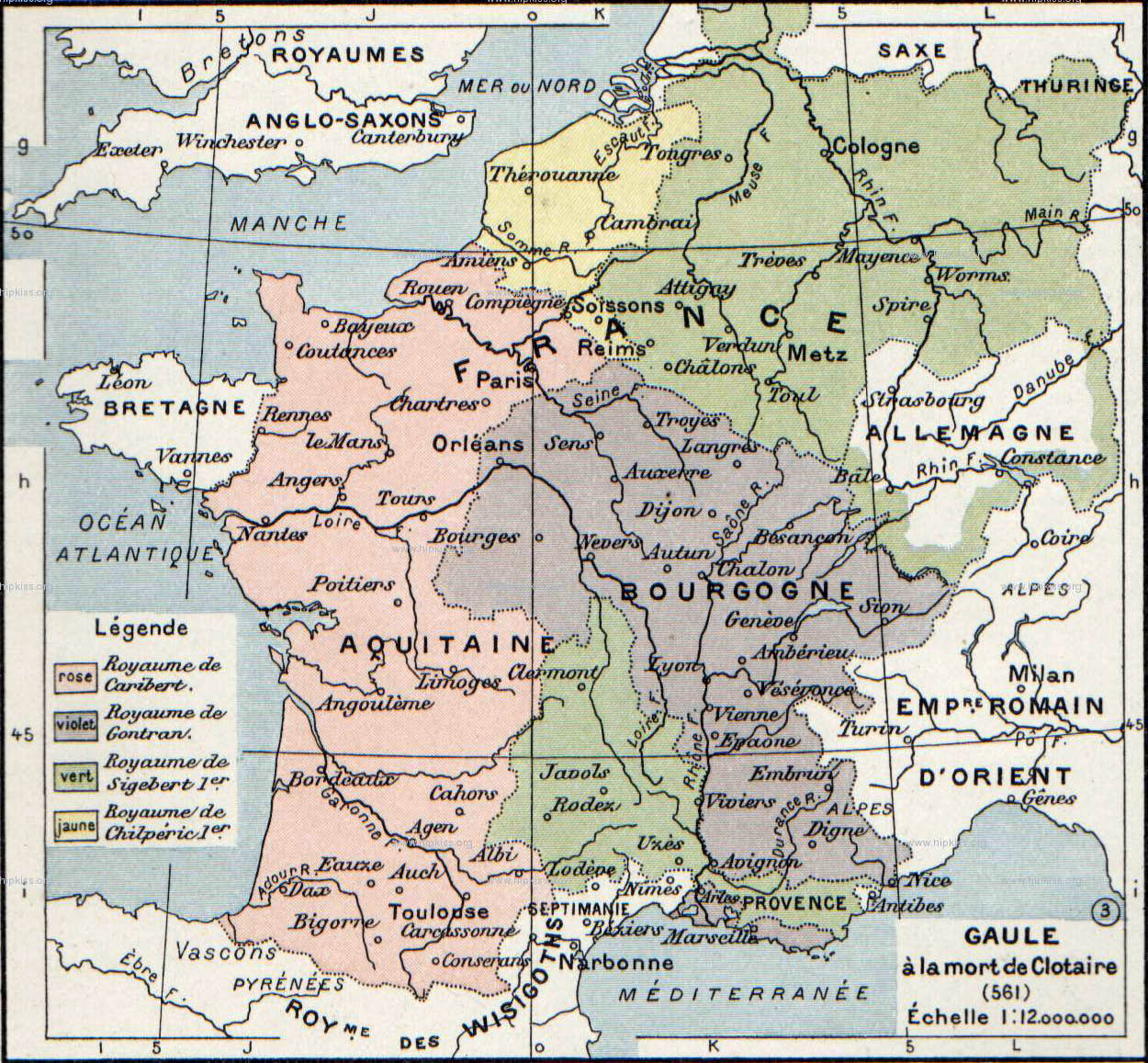
The Frankish Kingdom after Chlothar's death

Year 561 (DLXI) was a common year starting on Saturday of the Julian calendar. The denomination 561 for this year has been used since the early medieval period, when the Anno Domini calendar era became the prevalent method in Europe for naming years.

== Events ==
=== By place ===
==== Europe ====
- November 29 – King Chlothar I ("the Old") dies at Compiègne at age 64. The Merovingian dynasty is continued by his four sons (Charibert I, Guntram, Sigebert I and Chilperic I), who divide the Frankish Kingdom and rule from the capitals at Paris, Orléans, Reims and Soissons, respectively.

==== Britain ====
- The Battle of Cúl Drebene (modern Ireland) is fought between the Northern and Southern Uí Néill (approximate date).

==== Asia ====
- Winter – Wu Cheng Di succeeds his brother Xiao Zhao Di, who dies from injuries suffered while hunting, as Chinese emperor of Northern Qi.

==== Americas ====
- Sky Witness is crowned as leader of Calakmul.

=== By topic ===
==== Religion ====
- March 4 – Pope Pelagius I dies in Rome after a five-year reign, and is succeeded by John III as the 61st pope.
- Jnanagupta, a Buddhist monk from Gandhara (Pakistan), begins translating Buddhist texts into Chinese.
- The First Council of Braga is held. The council condemns the doctrine of Priscillianism.

== Births ==
- Yang Lihua, empress of Northern Zhou (d. 609)

== Deaths ==
- March 4 – Pope Pelagius I
- November 29 – Chlothar I, king of the Franks
- Chram, Frankish prince and son of Chlothar I
- Fei Di, emperor of Northern Qi (b. 545)
- Xiao Zhao Di, emperor of Northern Qi (b. 535)
