= 570 =

Calendar year

570 in various calendars
- Gregorian calendar: 570; DLXX
- Ab urbe condita: 1323
- Armenian calendar: 19; ԹՎ ԺԹ
- Assyrian calendar: 5320
- Balinese saka calendar: 491–492
- Bengali calendar: −24 – −23
- Berber calendar: 1520
- Buddhist calendar: 1114
- Burmese calendar: −68
- Byzantine calendar: 6078–6079
- Chinese calendar: 己丑年 (Earth Ox); 3267 or 3060 — to — 庚寅年 (Metal Tiger); 3268 or 3061
- Coptic calendar: 286–287
- Discordian calendar: 1736
- Ethiopian calendar: 562–563
- Hebrew calendar: 4330–4331
- Hindu calendars
- Vikram Samvat: 626–627
- Shaka Samvat: 491–492
- Kali Yuga: 3670–3671
- Holocene calendar: 10570
- Iranian calendar: 52 BP – 51 BP
- Islamic calendar: 54 BH – 53 BH
- Javanese calendar: 458–459
- Julian calendar: 570; DLXX
- Korean calendar: 2903
- Minguo calendar: 1342 before ROC 民前1342年
- Nanakshahi calendar: −898
- Seleucid era: 881/882 AG
- Thai solar calendar: 1112–1113
- Tibetan calendar: ས་མོ་གླང་ལོ་ (female Earth-Ox); 696 or 315 or −457 — to — ལྕགས་ཕོ་སྟག་ལོ་ (male Iron-Tiger); 697 or 316 or −456

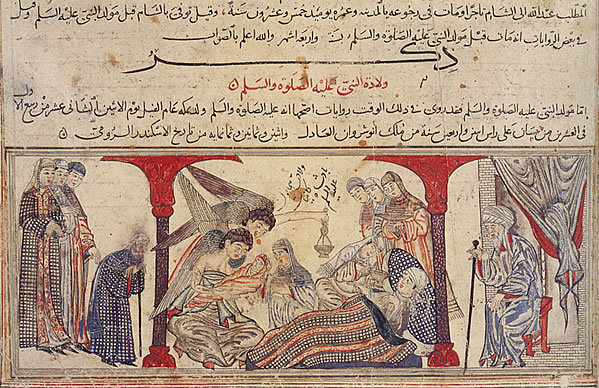
The birth of Muhammad (c. 570–632)

Year 570 (DLXX) was a common year starting on Wednesday of the Julian calendar. The denomination 570 for this year has been used since the early medieval period, when the Anno Domini calendar era became the prevalent method in Europe for naming years.

== Events ==
=== By place ===
==== Europe ====
- Battle of Gwen Ystrad: A British alliance is forged between the kingdoms of Strathclyde, Bryneich and Elmet (approximate date).
- Spoleto becomes the capital of an independent duchy, under the Lombard chieftain Faroald (approximate date).
- Leutfred becomes duke of Alemannia (modern Germany).

==== Persia ====
- Ctesiphon, capital of the Sassanid Empire, becomes the largest city in the world, taking the lead from Constantinople, capital of the Byzantine Empire.

==== Arabia ====
- Muhammad, Islamic prophet, is born in Mecca (today's Saudi Arabia). His father Abdullah ibn Abd al-Muttalib dies a few months before his birth, so he and his mother Aminah bint Wahb are protected by Muhammad's paternal grandfather, Abdul Muttalib, who is recognized as the leading figure in his tribe, the Quraysh.
- Abraha, Christian ruler of coastal Yemen, who was acting as a general for the Christian kingdom in Abyssinia, begins a military expedition in Arabia against the predominantly pagan Quraysh of Mecca, known as the Year of the Elephant.

=== By topic ===
==== Religion ====
- A limestone statue of Boddhisattva is created in Henan (approximate date).
- The first mention is made of the Spear of Destiny (approximate date).
- The Jews of Clermont-Ferrand are forced to convert to Christianity.
- Year of the Elephant, according to Islamic tradition.
- The anonymous Pilgrim of Piacenza travels the Holy Sites of Christianity in Syria, Palestine and Sinai, an experience that he later writes down as a travel report (approximate date).

== Births ==
- Ammar ibn Yasir, companion of Muhammad.
- Chen Yuan, crown prince of the Chen dynasty (approximate date)
- Childebert II, king of Austrasia (d. 595)
- Gao Heng, emperor of Northern Qi (d. 577)
- Imerius of Immertal, Swiss monk (approximate date)
- Khosrow II, last great Sasanian king of Iran (d. 628)
- Li Dashi, Chinese official and historian (d. 628)
- Muhammad, last prophet of Islam (d. 632) (approximate date)
- Namri Songtsen, king of Tibet (approximate date)
- Pei Ji, chancellor of the Tang dynasty (d. 629)
- Pybba, king of Mercia (approximate date)
- Rigunth, daughter of Chilperic I (d. 585)
- Theodelinda, queen of the Lombards (d. 628)

== Deaths ==
- January 15 – Íte of Killeedy, Irish nun
- Abdullah ibn Abd al-Muttalib, father of Muhammad (b. 545)
- Abraha, an Aksumite army general, Islamic tradition places his death immediately after his expedition to the Hejaz
- Antonina, wife of Belisarius (approximate date)
- Armel, Breton prince and bishop (approximate date)
- Fei Di, emperor of the Chen dynasty
- Gildas, British cleric
- John Philoponus, Aristotelian commentator (b. 490)
- Soga no Iname, leader of the Soga clan
- Zhang Yao'er, empress dowager of the Chen dynasty (b. 506)
