= 535 =

Calendar year

535 in various calendars
Gregorian calendar	535; DXXXV
Ab urbe condita	1288
Assyrian calendar	5285
Balinese saka calendar	456–457
Bengali calendar	−59 – −58
Berber calendar	1485
Buddhist calendar	1079
Burmese calendar	−103
Byzantine calendar	6043–6044
Chinese calendar	甲寅年 (Wood Tiger); 3232 or 3025 — to — 乙卯年 (Wood Rabbit); 3233 or 3026
Coptic calendar	251–252
Discordian calendar	1701
Ethiopian calendar	527–528
Hebrew calendar	4295–4296
- Hindu calendars
Vikram Samvat	591–592
Shaka Samvat	456–457
Kali Yuga	3635–3636
Holocene calendar	10535
Iranian calendar	87 BP – 86 BP
Islamic calendar	90 BH – 89 BH
Javanese calendar	422–423
Julian calendar	535; DXXXV
Korean calendar	2868
Minguo calendar	1377 before ROC 民前1377年
Nanakshahi calendar	−933
Seleucid era	846/847 AG
Thai solar calendar	1077–1078
Tibetan calendar	ཤིང་ཕོ་སྟག་ལོ་ (male Wood-Tiger); 661 or 280 or −492 — to — ཤིང་མོ་ཡོས་ལོ་ (female Wood-Hare); 662 or 281 or −491

The Gothic War: Belisarius subdues the Goths

Year 535 (DXXXV) was a common year starting on Monday of the Julian calendar. At the time, it was known as the Year of the Consulship of Belisarius without colleague (or, less frequently, year 1288 Ab urbe condita). The denomination 535 for this year has been used since the early medieval period, when the Anno Domini calendar era became the prevalent method in Europe for naming years.

== Events ==
=== By place ===
==== Europe ====
- April 30 – King Theodahad revenges himself upon Queen Amalasuintha. He has her taken from the capital of Ravenna to a small island on Lake Bolsena, where she is strangled in her bath.
- The death of Amalasuintha gives Byzantine Emperor Justinian I a pretext to invade Italy and begin the Gothic War.
- The Byzantine city of Justiniana Prima is founded, and later becomes a bishop's seat of the Central Balkans.

==== Byzantine Empire ====
- Gothic War: Emperor Justinian I appoints Belisarius commander-in-chief (stratēgos autokratōr), and sends a Byzantine expeditionary force of only 8,000 soldiers (half are heavy East Roman cavalry) to begin the reconquest of Italy.
- Summer – Belisarius lands in Sicily and meets little opposition, save for the Gothic garrison of Palermo. Laying siege to the citadel, he blockades the harbour with his ships. Mundus invades Dalmatia and captures its capital, Salona.
- Justinian I issues the Lex Julia and declares that a wife has no right to bring criminal charges of adultery against a husband. This makes divorce almost impossible in the Byzantine Empire.
- December 31 – Belisarius completes the conquest of Sicily, defeating the Gothic garrison of Palermo (Panormos), and ending his consulship for the year.

==== Africa ====
- Spring – Solomon defeats the Moorish rebels at Mount Mammes and Mount Bourgaon. He secures Byzacena (modern Tunisia) and establishes fortifications along the Numidian border.
- April – Justinian I reorganises the province as an African prefecture, centered in Carthage. He restores frontier defences, and returns property to the Catholic Church.

==== Asia ====
- The Northern Wei dynasty ends: The northern region of China is split into the Eastern Wei and the Western Wei during a civil war. The first ruler is Wen Di; he makes his son Fei Di crown prince.
- Significant to the history of agriculture, Chinese author Jia Sixia writes the treatise "Chimin Yaoshu" in this year, and although it quotes 160 previous Chinese agronomy books, it is the oldest existent Chinese agriculture treatise. In over 100,000 written Chinese characters, the book covers land preparation, seeding, cultivation, orchard management, forestry, animal husbandry, trade, and culinary uses for crops.
- Reports of the eruption of Krakatoa (Java), which possibly led to several years of climate change (see Extreme weather events of 535–536), are recorded in the Javanese Book of Kings.

=== By topic ===
==== Religion ====
- May 8 – Pope John II dies in Rome after a two-year reign, and is succeeded by Agapetus I as the 57th pope. Agapetus is sent by King Theodahad on an embassy to Constantinople.
- Byzantine troops drive the extremist Monophysite party out of Alexandria, and establish Theodosius I as patriarch of the Eastern Orthodox Church.
- Anthimus I becomes patriarch of Constantinople (535–536).
- A Christian basilica is completed at Leptis Magna in North Africa.

==== Meteorology ====
- The weather is reported to be unusually cold and dark in multiple parts of the world; see Extreme weather events of 535–536.

== Births ==
- Abu Talib ibn Abd al-Muttalib, uncle of the prophet Muhammad, father of Ali Ibn Abi Talib (d. 619)
- Evagrius Scholasticus, Syrian scholar (approximate date)
- Sigebert I, king of Austrasia (approximate date)
- Theudebald, king of Austrasia (approximate date)
- Xiao Zhao Di, emperor of Northern Qi (d. 561)

== Deaths ==
- May 8 – Pope John II
- June 5 – Epiphanius, patriarch of Constantinople
- Eugippius, disciple and biographer
- Timothy III, Coptic Orthodox Patriarch of Alexandria
- Xie He, Chinese writer and art historian (approximate date)
- Xu Mian, official of the Liang dynasty (b. 466)
- Xiao Wu Di, emperor of Northern Wei (b. 510)
