= Saint-Divy =

Saint-Divy Sant-Divi
- Commune
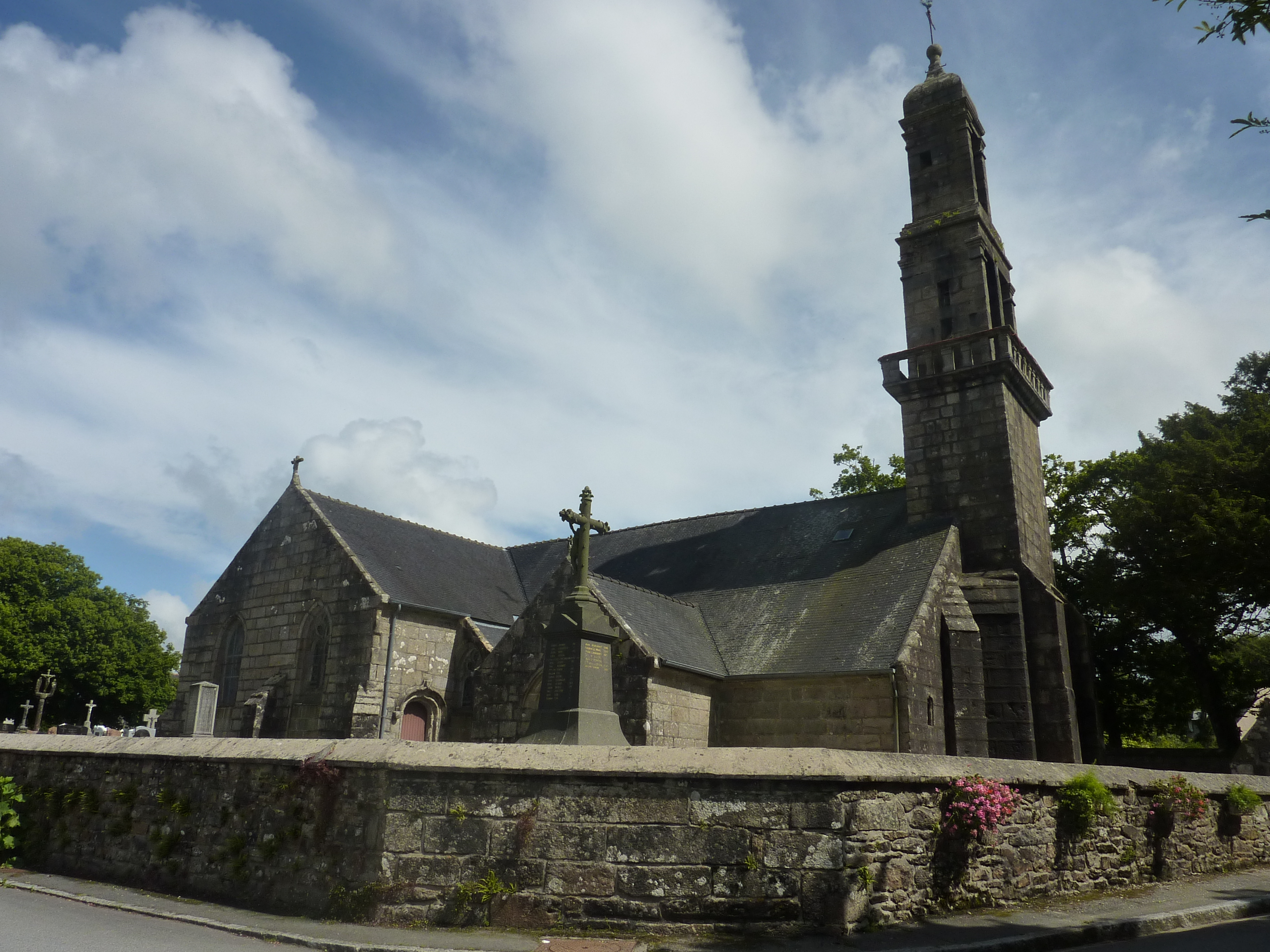
- The parish church in Saint-Divy
- Location of Saint-Divy
- Location within France Location within Brittany
- Coordinates: 48°27′16″N 4°20′04″W
- Country: France
- Region: Brittany
- Department: Finistère
- Arrondissement: Brest
- Canton: Landerneau
- Intercommunality: CA Pays de Landerneau-Daoulas

Government
  - Mayor (2020–2026): Michel Corre
- Area^{1}: 8.52 km^{2} (3.29 sq mi)
- Highest elevation: 129 m (423 ft)
- Lowest elevation: 30 m (98 ft)
- Population (2023): 1,605
  - Density: 188/km^{2} (488/sq mi)
- Time zone: UTC+01:00 (CET)
  - Summer (DST): UTC+02:00 (CEST)
- INSEE/Postal code: 29245 /29800
- ^{1} French Land Register data, which excludes lakes, ponds, glaciers > 1 km^{2} (0.386 sq mi or 247 acres) and river estuaries.

Saint-Divy (French pronunciation: [sɛ̃ divi]; Breton: Sant-Divi) is a commune in the Finistère department of Brittany in north-western France.

== Population ==
Inhabitants of Saint-Divy are called in French Saint-Divyens.

Historical population

Year	Pop.	±% p.a.
1793	570	—
1821	552	−0.11%
1846	672	+0.79%
1872	633	−0.23%
1901	637	+0.02%
1926	600	−0.24%
1946	714	+0.87%
1954	614	−1.87%
1962	529	−1.85%

Year	Pop.	±% p.a.
1968	533	+0.13%
1975	745	+4.90%
1982	1,141	+6.28%
1990	1,413	+2.71%
1999	1,407	−0.05%
2007	1,311	−0.88%
2012	1,414	+1.52%
2017	1,537	+1.68%
2023	1,605	+0.72%

Source: EHESS and INSEE (1968-2023)

== See also ==
- Communes of the Finistère department
- Saint Divy Parish close
