= Ratna Pariksha =

Hindu technique to test jewellery

Ratna Pariksha is an ancient science on testing gemstones. It was used by the Kosadhyaksha (Superintendent of Treasury) and mentioned in Kautilya's Arthashastra in order to control the trade of pearl, diamonds and all the other important gems in antiquity. It classifies gemstones into Maha-Ratna and Upa-ratna (lit. 'Great Gems and Second Class Gems').

== History ==
Ratna Pariksha is mentioned in Kautilya's Arthashastra (323–299 BC). Vātsyāyana, the author of the Kama Sutra also mentions rupa-ratna-pariksha. The method was also studied by princes in Karnataka during the medieval period.

The author of the treatise is very commonly known to be one Buddha Bhatt. There is also mention of another author in the medieval period, Thakkar Pheru, who is again credited with having worked on this subject. There is a mention of one Vaidyaraj Shri Radha Krisha Navetia who uses Ratna Pariksha for preparing a type of alcohol meant in the use of gem refining.

== Bibliography ==
- Mookerji, Radhakumud (1990), Ancient Indian Education: Brahmanical and Buddhist, vol. 11 of History and Culture Series, Motilal Banarsidass, ISBN 978-81-208-0423-4
- Johari, Harish (1996), The Healing Power of Gemstones: In Tantra, Ayurveda, and Astrology, Inner Traditions / Bear & Company, p. 202, ISBN 978-0-89281-608-8
- Mubarak, Abu al-Fazl ibn (1978), The A'in-I Akbari : an encyclopaedia of Hindu philosophy, science, literature and customs, with the life of the author and Akbar's wise sayings, vol. 3, translator: Jarrett, H. S, revised and further annotated by Jadunath Sarkar, New Delhi: Oriental Books Reprint Corporation
- Asiatic Society (Calcutta, and Bengal) (1848), Bibliotheca Indica, vol. 270, Calcutta, India: Asiatic Society
- Roger Calverley (2007), Crystal Yoga I: The Crystal Mesa (v. 1), Lotus Press, ISBN 978-0-940985-92-6
- Gemmology- a study based on ancient Sanskrit Sources- (2013)PhD Thesis- submitted by Dr.G.Sudev Krishna Sharman under the guidance of Dr.C. Rajendran at Department of Sanskrit, University of Calicut, Kerala, India
