= Saint David =

Patron saint of Wales (c. 500 – c. 589)

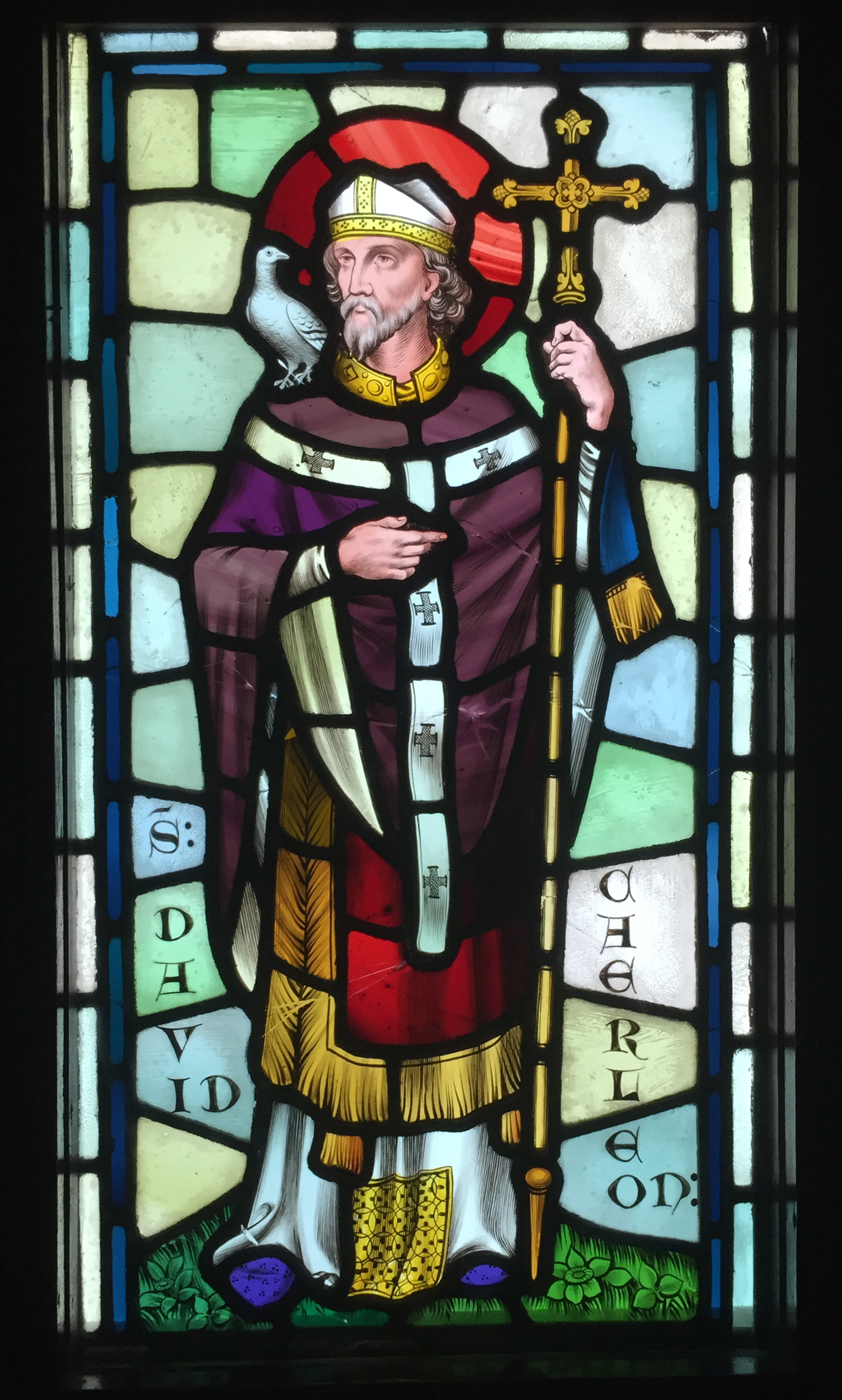
- Stained glass depiction of Saint David, designed by William Burges, at Castell Coch, Cardiff

Abbot and Bishop
- Born: Unknown, estimated at c. 500; Unknown, c. Caerfai, Dyfed, or somewhere in Ceredigion
- Died: 1 March 589; Mynyw, Dyfed
- Venerated in: Catholic Church; Eastern Orthodox Church; Anglican Communion
- Canonized: 1123, Rome, Papal States, by Pope Callixtus II (officially recognised)
- Major shrine: St David's Cathedral, Pembrokeshire, Wales, United Kingdom
- Feast: 1 March
- Attributes: Bishop with a dove, usually on his shoulder, sometimes standing on a raised hillock
- Patronage: Wales; Pembrokeshire; Naas; vegetarians; poets
- Controversy: The earliest of the supposed bones of Saint David and Saint Justinian housed in a casket in the Holy Trinity Chapel of St David's Cathedral have been carbon-dated to the 12th century.

David (Welsh: Dewi Sant; Latin: Davidus; c. 500 – c. 589) was a Welsh Christian prelate who served as Bishop of Mynyw during the 6th century. He is the patron saint of Wales.

David was a native of Wales, and tradition has preserved a large amount of detail about his life. His birth date, however, is uncertain: suggestions range from 462 to 512. He is traditionally believed to be the son of Non and the grandson of Ceredig ap Cunedda, king of Ceredigion. The Welsh annals placed his death 569 years after the birth of Christ, but Phillimore's dating revised this to 601.

== Hagiography ==
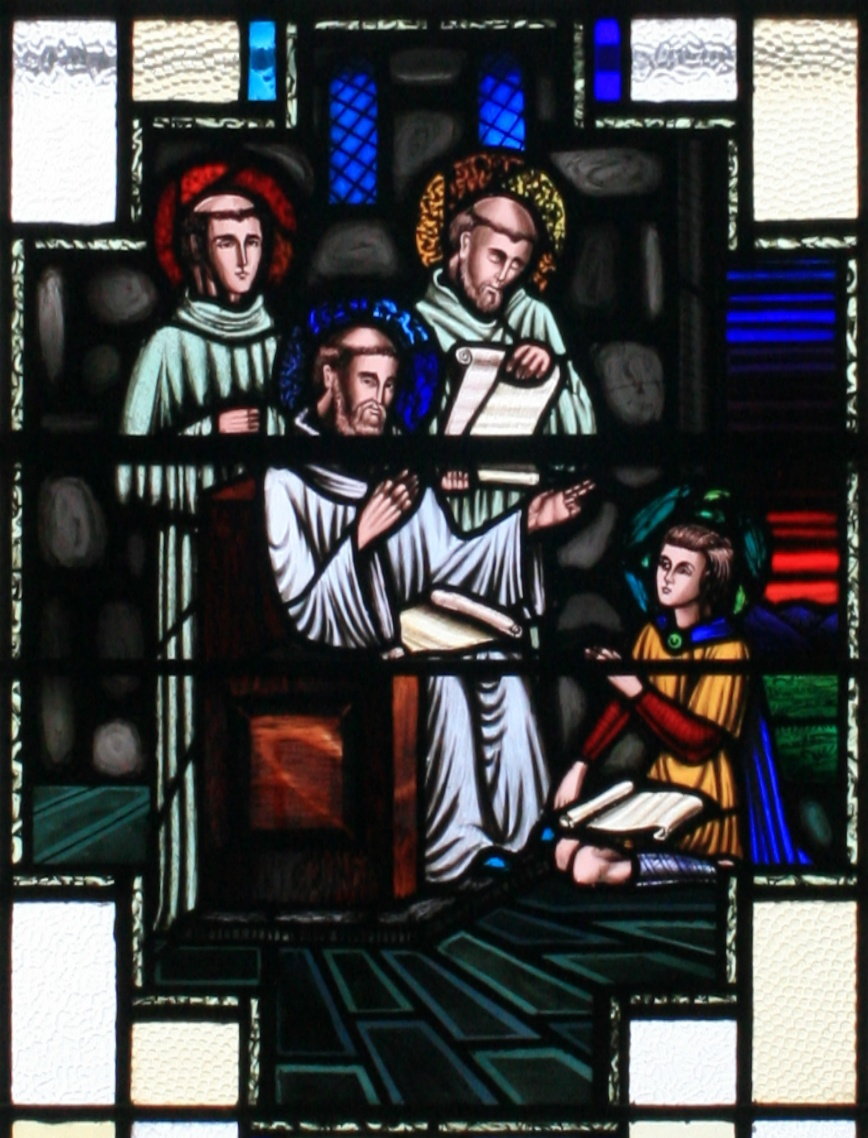
St. David as the teacher of Finnian of Clonard in a stained glass window restored to its 1181 appearance at Clonard

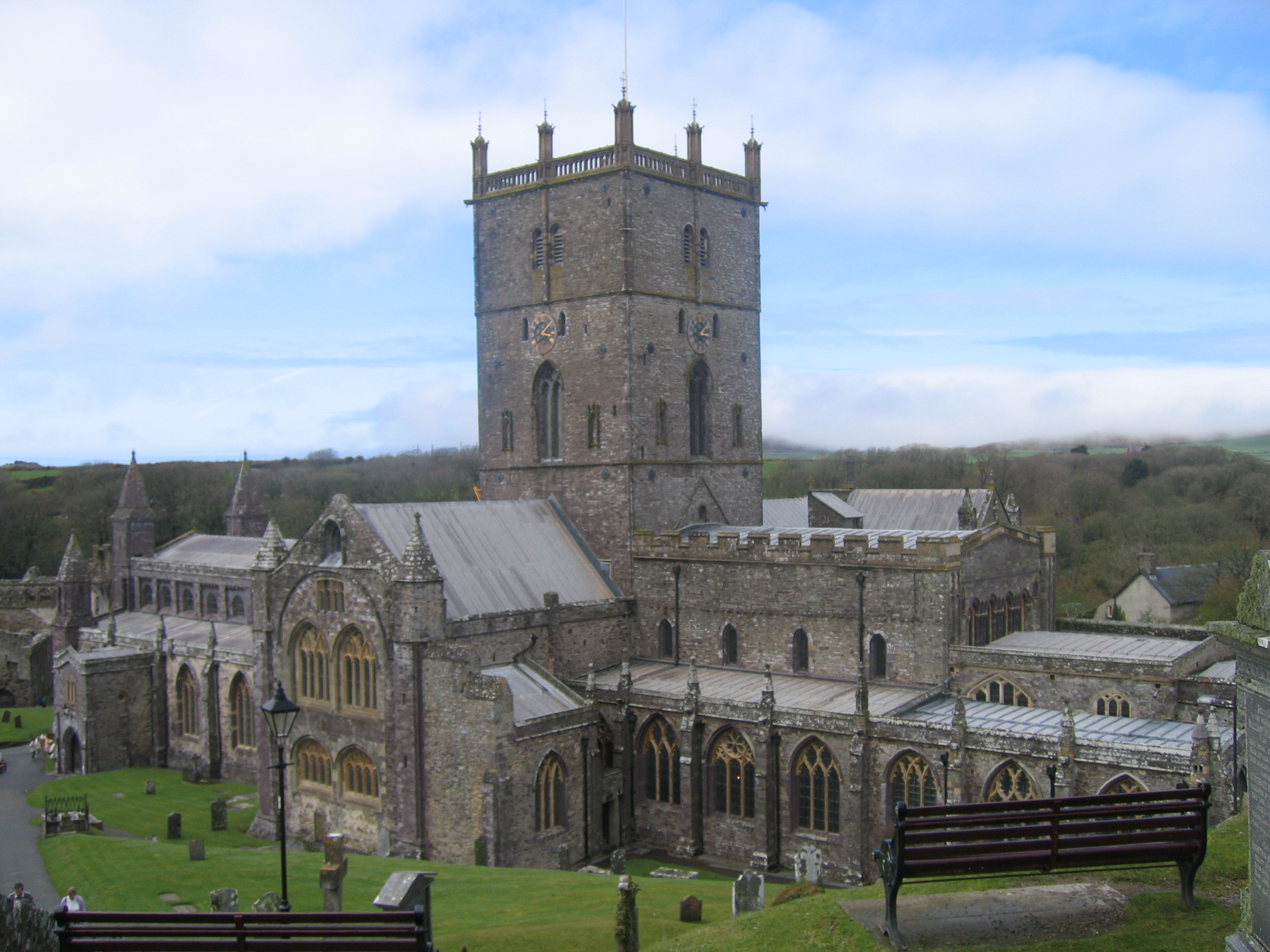
St David's Cathedral, St Davids, Pembrokeshire

Many of the traditional tales about David are found in the Buchedd Dewi ("Life of David"), a hagiography written by Rhygyfarch around 1090. Rhygyfarch claimed it was based on documents found in the cathedral archives. Modern historians are sceptical of some of its claims: one of Rhygyfarch's aims was to establish some independence for the Welsh church, which had refused the Roman rite until the 8th century and now sought a metropolitan status equal to that of Canterbury (this may apply to the supposed pilgrimage to Jerusalem where he is said to have been anointed as an archbishop by the patriarch).

The tradition that he was born at Henfynyw (Vetus-Menevia) in Ceredigion is not improbable. He became renowned as a teacher and preacher, founding monastic settlements and churches in Wales, Dumnonia, and Brittany. St David's Cathedral stands on the site of the monastery he founded in the Glyn Rhosyn valley of Pembrokeshire. Around 550, he attended the Synod of Brefi, where his eloquence in opposing Pelagianism caused his fellow monks to elect him primate of the region. As such he presided over the synod of Caerleon (the "Synod of Victory") around 569.

His best-known miracle is said to have taken place when he was preaching in the middle of a large crowd at the Synod of Brefi: the village of Llanddewi Brefi stands on the spot where the ground on which he stood is reputed to have risen up to form a small hill. A white dove, which became his emblem, was seen settling on his shoulder. David is said to have denounced Pelagianism during this incident and he was declared archbishop by popular acclaim according to Rhygyfarch, bringing about the retirement of Dubricius. St David's metropolitan status as an archbishopric was later supported by Bernard, Bishop of St David's, Geoffrey of Monmouth, and Gerald of Wales.

The Monastic Rule of David prescribed that monks had to pull the plough themselves without draught animals, and must eat only bread with salt and herbs and drink only water getting them the name "watermen". The monks spent their evenings in prayer, reading and writing. No personal possessions were allowed: even to say "my book" was considered an offence. He lived a simple life and practised asceticism, teaching his followers to refrain from eating meat and drinking beer. His symbol, also the symbol of Wales, is the leek (this inspires a reference in William Shakespeare's Henry V, Act IV scene 7):

Fluellen: "If your Majesty is remembered of it, the Welshmen did good service in a garden where leeks did grow, wearing leeks in their Monmouth caps, which your Majesty knows, to this hour is an honourable badge of the service, and I do believe, your Majesty takes no scorn to wear the leek upon Saint Tavy's day". King Henry: "I wear it for a memorable honour; for I am Welsh, you know, good countryman".

=== Connections to Glastonbury ===
Rhigyfarch counted Glastonbury Abbey among the churches David founded. Around forty years later William of Malmesbury, believing the Abbey older, said that David visited Glastonbury only to rededicate the Abbey and to donate a travelling altar including a great sapphire. He had had a vision of Jesus who said that "the church had been dedicated long ago by Himself in honour of His Mother, and it was not seemly that it should be re-dedicated by human hands". So David instead commissioned an extension to be built to the abbey, east of the Old Church. (The dimensions of this extension given by William were verified archaeologically in 1921.) One manuscript indicates that a sapphire altar was among the items which Henry VIII confiscated from the abbey during the Dissolution of the Monasteries a thousand years later.

== Death ==
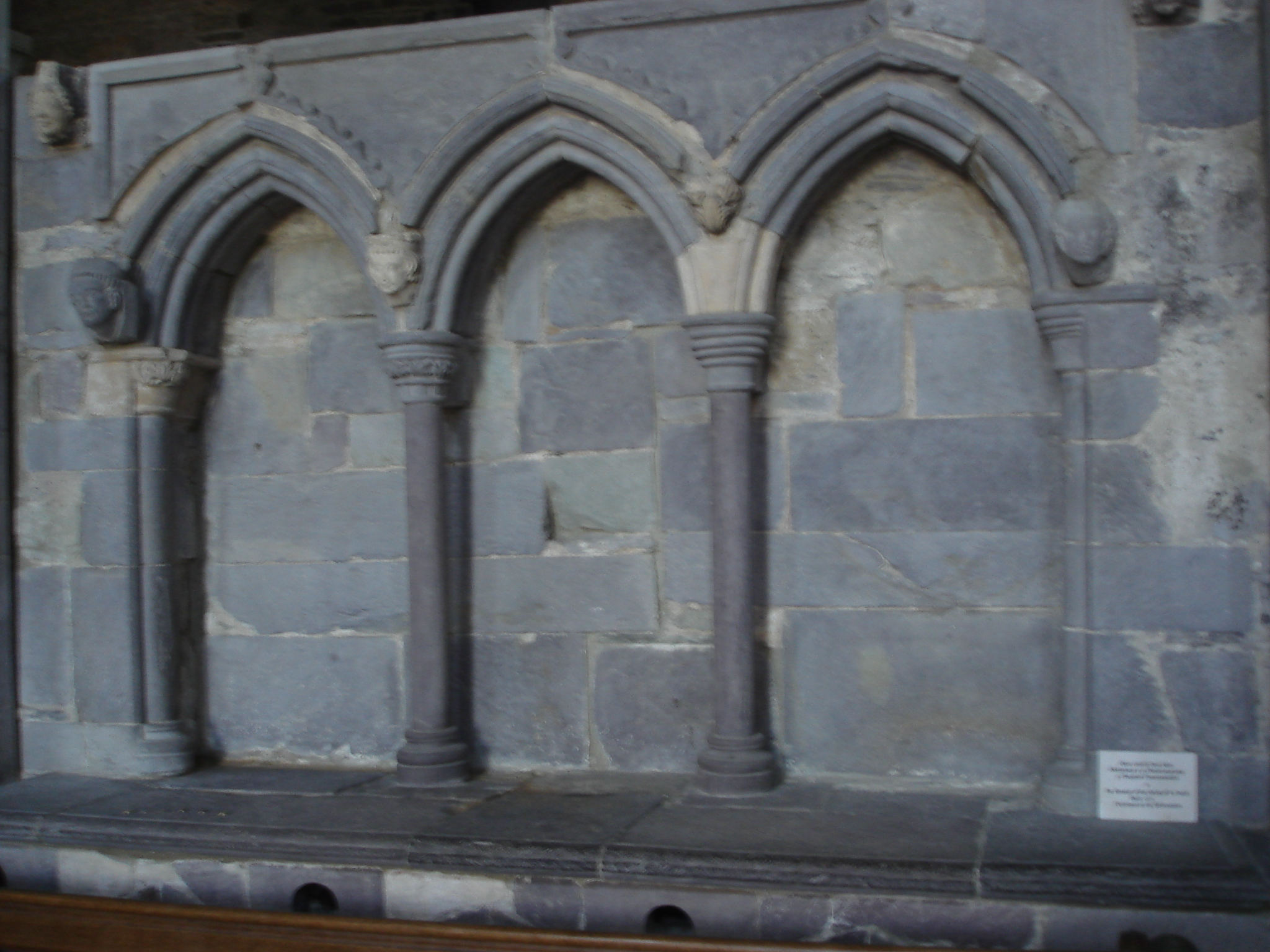
The Shrine of Saint David prior to its reconstruction in the early twenty-first century.

Though the exact date of his death is not certain, tradition holds that it was on 1 March, which is the date now marked as Saint David's Day. The two most common years given for his death are 601 and 589. The monastery is said to have been "filled with angels as Christ received his soul". His last words to his followers were in a sermon on the previous Sunday. The Welsh Life of St David gives these as, "Arglwyddi, brodyr, a chwiorydd, Byddwch lawen a chadwch eich ffyd a'ch credd, a gwnewch y petheu bychain a glywsoch ac y welsoch gennyf i. A mwynhau a gerdaf y fford yd aeth an tadeu idi", which translates as, "Lords, brothers and sisters, Be joyful, and keep your faith and your creed, and do the little things that you have seen me do and heard about. And as for me, I will walk the path that our fathers have trod before us." "Do ye the little things in life" ("Gwnewch y pethau bychain mewn bywyd") is today a very well known phrase in Welsh. The same passage states that he died on a Tuesday, from which attempts have been made to calculate the year of his death.

David was buried at St David's Cathedral at St Davids, Pembrokeshire, where his shrine was a popular place of pilgrimage throughout the Middle Ages. During the 10th and 11th centuries the cathedral was regularly raided by Vikings, who removed the shrine from the church and stripped off the precious metal adornments. In 1275 a new shrine was constructed, the ruined base of which remains to this day (see photo), which was originally surmounted by an ornamental wooden canopy with murals of David, Patrick and Denis. The relics of David and Justinian of Ramsey Island were kept in a portable casket on the stone base of the shrine. It was at this shrine that Edward I came to pray in 1284. During the reformation Bishop Barlow (1536–48), a staunch Protestant, stripped the shrine of its jewels and confiscated the relics of David and Justinian.

== Veneration ==
The Flag of Saint David

David was officially recognised at the Holy See by Pope Callixtus II in 1120, thanks to the work of Bernard, Bishop of St David's. Music for his Liturgy of the Hours has been edited by O. T. Edwards in Matins, Lauds and Vespers for St David's Day: the Medieval Office of the Welsh Patron Saint in National Library of Wales MS 20541 E (Cambridge, 1990). David was also canonized by the Eastern Orthodox Church at an unknown date.

Over 50 churches in South Wales were dedicated to him in pre-Reformation days. There is currently a St. David's Church in Baltimore, Maryland, one near Wayne, Pennsylvania, and a Saint David of Wales Episcopal Church in Portland, Oregon.

In the 2004 edition of the Roman Martyrology, David is listed under 1 March with the Latin name Dávus. He is recognised as bishop of Menevia in Wales who governed his monastery following the example of the Eastern Fathers. Through his leadership, many monks went forth to evangelise Wales, Ireland, Cornwall and Armorica (Brittany and surrounding provinces).

The restored Shrine of Saint David was unveiled and rededicated by the Right Reverend Wyn Evans, Bishop of St David's, at a Choral Eucharist on Saint David's Day, 2012.

A broadside ballad published around 1630 claimed that the Welsh wore a leek in their hats to commemorate a battle fought on St David's Day. So as to recognise friend from foe, the Welsh had pulled up leeks from a garden and put them in their hats, before going on to win the battle.

Saint David is usually represented standing on a hill with a dove on his shoulder.

David is remembered in the Church of England with a Lesser Festival and on the Episcopal Church liturgical calendar on 1 March.

== Reputation ==
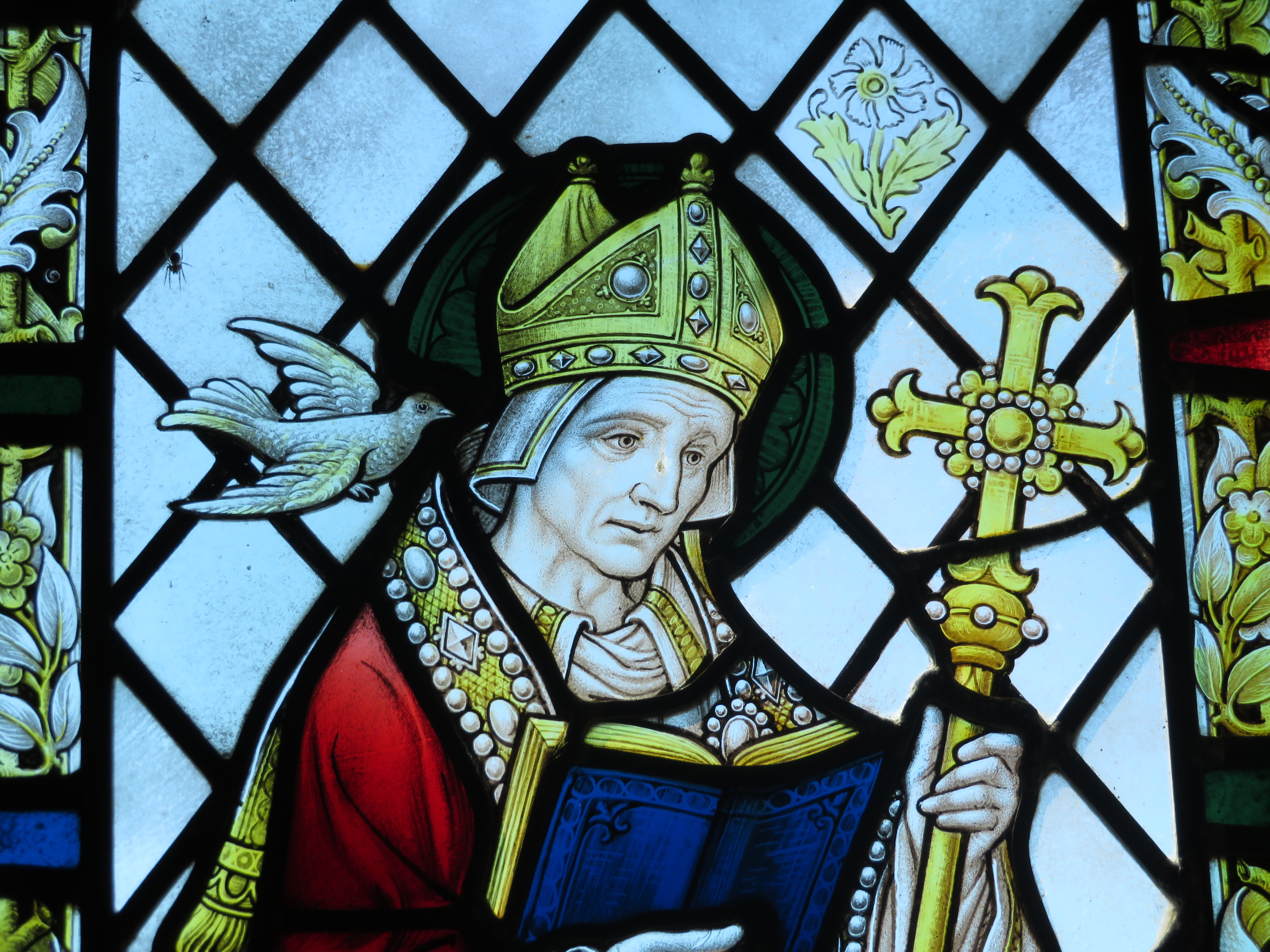
A stained glass window at St Non's Chapel, St David's

He was not explicitly named by contemporary sources although David may have been criticised without being named by Gildas the first explicit reference is in the Irish Martyrology of Tallaght in the early ninth century.

David's popularity in Wales is shown by the Armes Prydein of around 930, a poem which prophesied that in the future, when all might seem lost, the Cymry (Welsh people) would unite behind the standard of David to defeat the English; "A lluman glân Dewi a ddyrchafant" ("And they will raise the pure banner of Dewi").

David is said to have played a role in spreading Christianity on the continent, inspiring numerous place names in Brittany including Saint-Divy, Saint-Yvi and Landivy.

David's life and teachings have inspired a choral work by Welsh composer Karl Jenkins, Dewi Sant. It is a seven-movement work best known for the classical crossover series Adiemus, which intersperses movements reflecting the themes of David's last sermon with those drawing from three Psalms. An oratorio by another Welsh composer Arwel Hughes, also entitled Dewi Sant, was composed in 1950.

Saint David is also thought to be associated with corpse candles, lights that would warn of the imminent death of a member of the community. The story goes that David prayed for his people to have some warning of their death, so that they could prepare themselves. In a vision, David's wish was granted and told that from then on, people who lived in the land of Dewi Sant (Saint David) "would be forewarned by the dim light of mysterious tapers when and where the death might be expected". The colour and size of the tapers indicated whether the person to die would be a woman, man, or child.

He was also mentioned in Irish writings in connection with Irish saints.

== See also ==
- Saint David's Day & Proposed St David's Day bank holiday
- St Davids, Pembrokeshire & Saint David's Cathedral
- Saint David's Castle & St David's Church, Naas
- Saint Divy Parish close, Brittany
- Saint David, patron saint archive
- Proposed origins of the tale of Davy Jones' Locker
