= 577 =

Calendar year

577 in various calendars
- Gregorian calendar: 577; DLXXVII
- Ab urbe condita: 1330
- Armenian calendar: 26; ԹՎ ԻԶ
- Assyrian calendar: 5327
- Balinese saka calendar: 498–499
- Bengali calendar: −17 – −16
- Berber calendar: 1527
- Buddhist calendar: 1121
- Burmese calendar: −61
- Byzantine calendar: 6085–6086
- Chinese calendar: 丙申年 (Fire Monkey); 3274 or 3067 — to — 丁酉年 (Fire Rooster); 3275 or 3068
- Coptic calendar: 293–294
- Discordian calendar: 1743
- Ethiopian calendar: 569–570
- Hebrew calendar: 4337–4338
- Hindu calendars
- Vikram Samvat: 633–634
- Shaka Samvat: 498–499
- Kali Yuga: 3677–3678
- Holocene calendar: 10577
- Iranian calendar: 45 BP – 44 BP
- Islamic calendar: 46 BH – 45 BH
- Javanese calendar: 465–467
- Julian calendar: 577; DLXXVII
- Korean calendar: 2910
- Minguo calendar: 1335 before ROC 民前1335年
- Nanakshahi calendar: −891
- Seleucid era: 888/889 AG
- Thai solar calendar: 1119–1120
- Tibetan calendar: མེ་ཕོ་སྤྲེ་ལོ་ (male Fire-Monkey); 703 or 322 or −450 — to — མེ་མོ་བྱ་ལོ་ (female Fire-Bird); 704 or 323 or −449

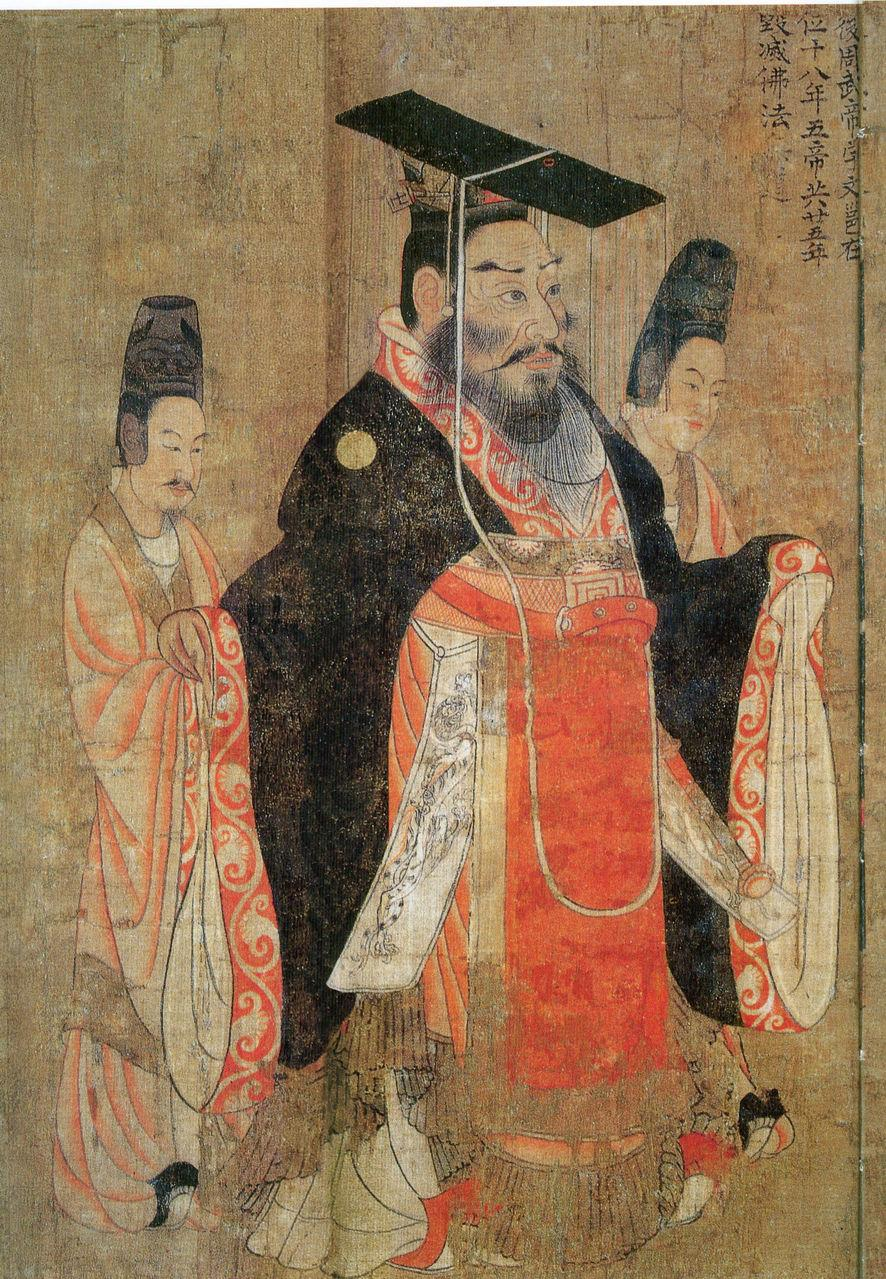
Emperor Wu Di of Northern Zhou (543–578)

Year 577 (DLXXVII) was a common year starting on Friday of the Julian calendar. The denomination 577 for this year has been used since early medieval times, when the Anno Domini calendar era became the prevalent method in Europe for naming years.

== Events ==
=== By place ===
==== Byzantine Empire ====
- Byzantine–Sassanid War: A Byzantine expeditionary force under command of Justinian (magister militum) invades Caucasian Albania, launching raids across the Caspian Sea against the Persians.
- Summer – Tiberius, Byzantine co-ruler (Caesar), establishes a naval base at Derbent on the Caspian Sea to construct a Byzantine fleet (approximate date).
- Winter – Maurice is appointed commander-in-chief of the Byzantine army in the East. He succeeds Justinian, despite complete lack of military experience.

==== Europe ====
- Battle of Deorham: The Anglo-Saxons under Ceawlin of Wessex invade the lower Severn Valley, and defeat the British Celts at Dyrham (South West England). After the battle, the Saxons occupy the three cities: Cirencester, Gloucester and Bath, bringing their advance to the Bristol Channel (according to the Anglo-Saxon Chronicle).
- Reccopolis (modern Zorita de los Canes) in Hispania is founded by King Liuvigild, in honour of his son Reccared.

==== Asia ====
- Winter – Northern Qi, one of the Northern Dynasties, is conquered by Northern Zhou under Emperor Wu Di. He orders the last ruler (Gao Wei) and other members of the Gao clan to commit suicide. Northern China, above the Yangtze River, is once again brought under the control of a single power.

=== By topic ===
==== Religion ====
- The Temple of Dendur, dedicated to the Egyptian gods Isis, Harpocrates (Horus) and Osiris, is converted for use as a Christian church (approximate date).
- Eutychius is restored as patriarch of Constantinople, after an exile of 12 years at Amasia (modern Turkey).
- Muhammad, age 6, returns to his immediate family, but within a year his mother Aminah bint Wahb dies.

==== Science and Invention ====
- A predecessor of the modern match, small sticks of pinewood impregnated with sulfur, are first used in China. Besieged by military forces of Northern Zhou and Chen, Northern Qi court ladies use the "lighting sticks" to start fires for cooking and heating.

== Births ==
- Pope Agatho (approximate date)
- Princess Ningyuan, Chinese princess
- Uthman ibn Affan, Muslim Caliph (d. 656)

== Deaths ==
- August 31 – John Scholasticus, patriarch of Constantinople
- Aldate, bishop and saint
- Aminah bint Wahb, mother of Muhammad
- Brendan, Irish abbot (approximate date)
- Gao Heng, emperor of Northern Qi (b. 570)
- Gao Wei, emperor of Northern Qi (b. 557)
- Gao Yanzong, prince of Northern Qi
- Lu Lingxuan, noblewoman of Northern Qi
- Mu Tipo, high official of Northern Qi
- Xiao Zhuang, prince of the Southern Dynasties (b. 548)
