= Saint Divy Parish close =

Coordinates: 48.4533°N 4.3356°W

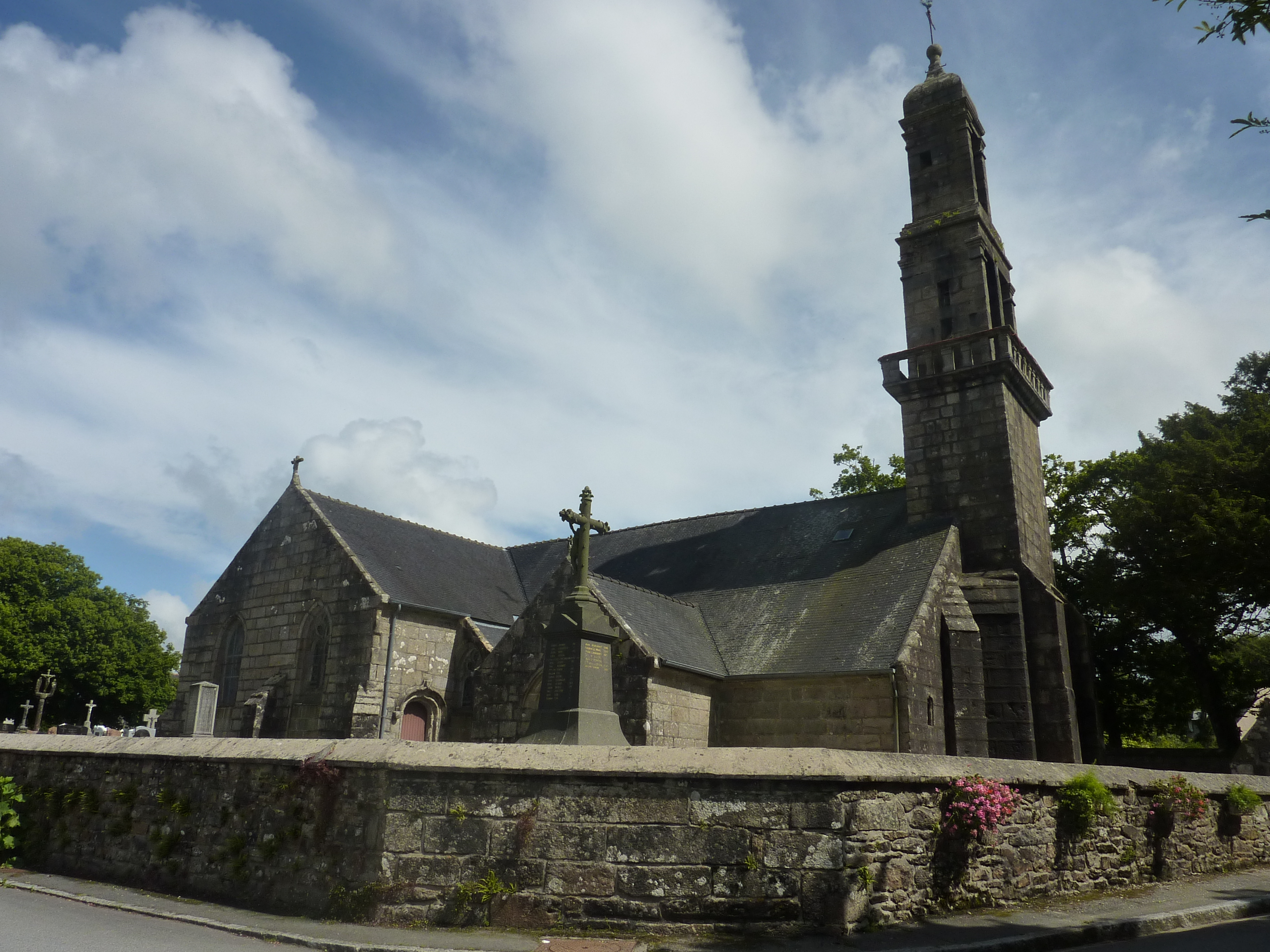
The Saint Divy church

The Saint Divy Parish close (enclos paroissial) is located at Saint-Divy in the arrondissement of Brest in Brittany in north-western France. This enclos paroissial is centered on the Église de Saint-Divy which was built in two stages, the first in 1531. It has been a listed historical monument since 1995.

== Description ==
There were major changes made to the church's interior in 1676 when, along with other work, the panels in the roof vaults were painted with scenes from the life of Saint Divy. A sacristy was added to the southern flank of the chevet in the 18th century and the bell tower, which had been hit by lightning, was reconstructed in 1823. The calvary at the enclos paroissial's entrance dates to the 16th century, as does the second calvary which is located in the cemetery. The church, the enclosure wall and the calvary by the entrance were all listed as recently at 1995. The parish church of Saint Divy comprises transept and choir and three bays. The north porch dates to 1629. Amongst the stained glass windows, that depicting the triumph of the Virgin Mary is outstanding and includes images of 90 people as well as the portrait of Hervé de La Palue who donated the window to the church. The Rosary Altar had an altarpiece illustrating the fifteen mysteries of the Rosary and the altar dedicated to the dead ("Les Trépassés") has statues in wood depicting Saints Isidore and Zite dressed in the costume of the lower Brittany region. The church has a statue of Saint Divy dated 1533 and a stoup (bénitier) in the Renaissance style dating to 1623. There is a confessional in the church and the baptismal font has a baldaquin. There is no ossuary in the enclos as it was demolished, albeit in the 20th century, and the traditional south porch is in fact positioned to the north of the church.

== Calvaries ==
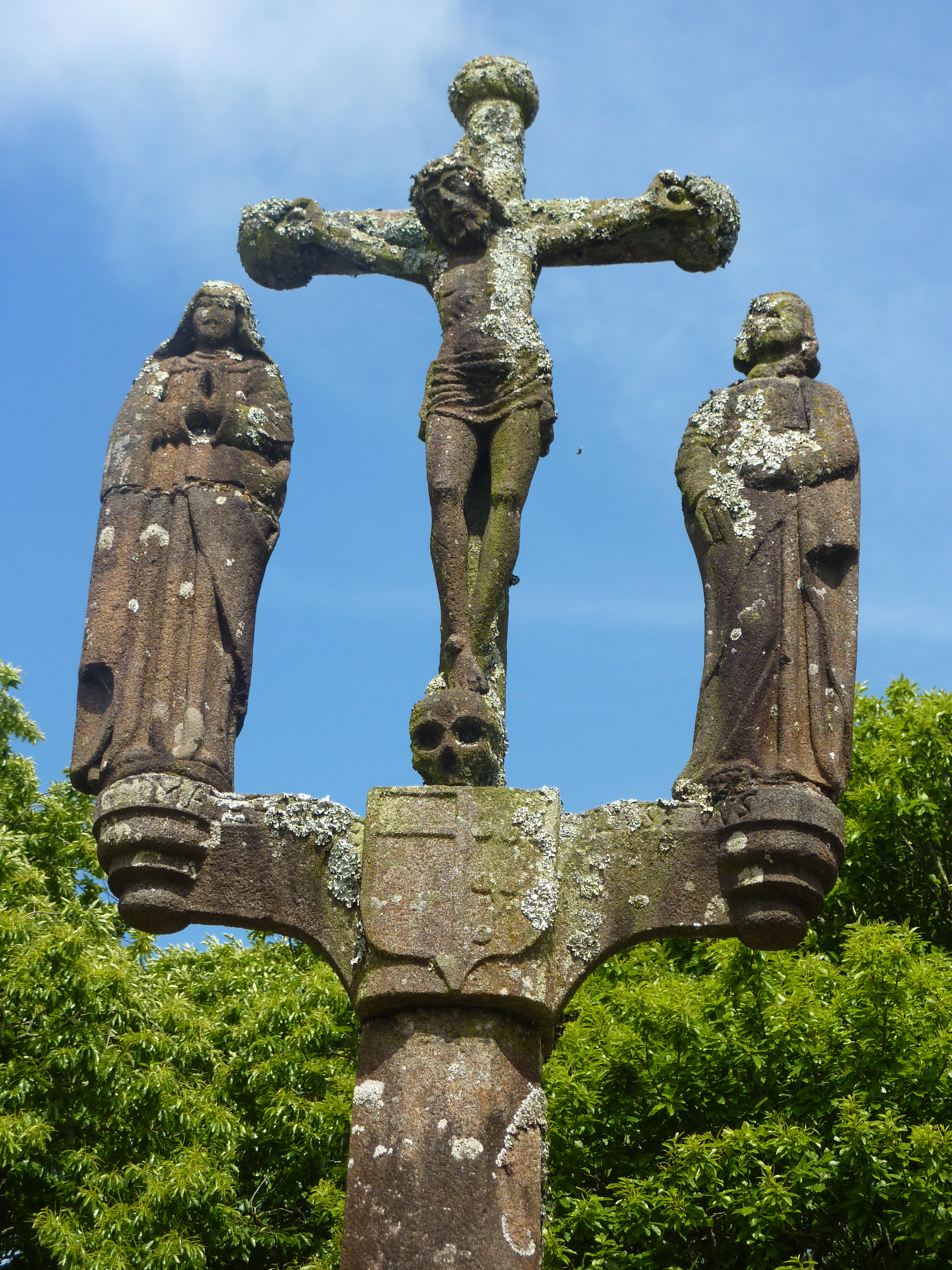
The 1652 calvary in the Saint Divy cemetery. Note skull at Jesus' feet and the inscription "MATER ECCE FILIVS TVVS. FRANCOIS TONCQVES"

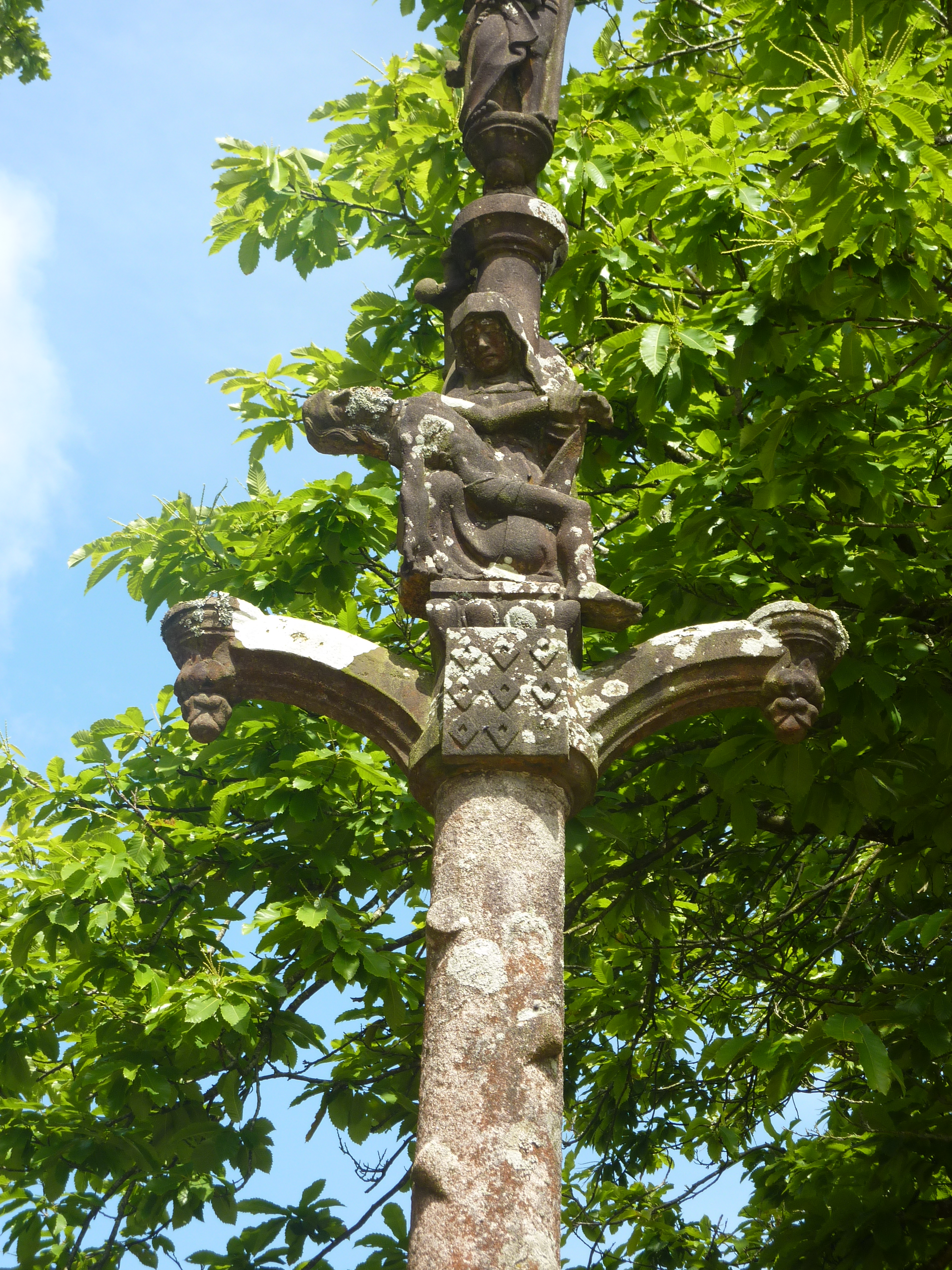
The calvary forming part of the entrance to the Saint Divy enclos paroissial. Note the "Vierge de Pitié"

The church has two calvaries, but firstly, and situated east of the enclos paroissial's grass enclosure ("placître"), there is an octagonal pedestal with the inscription in Gothic letters "LE PREMIER IOR DAOUEST L’AN MIL VCV". The first actual calvary dates to 1562 and stands by the enclos paroissial's east entrance. It comprises three crosses on pillars and effectively forms the enclos paroissial's entrance. On the central cross there is a "Vierge de Pitié" on the reverse side of the crucified Jesus and a depiction of Mary Magdalene at the base. The second calvary is located in the cemetery and dates to 1652. It has statues of the Virgin Mary and John the Evangelist. This calvary was transferred to Saint Divy from Kerdalaës in 1966.

== Stained glass ==
The much-restored stained glass window dates to 1531 and shows the influence of Dürer and Flemish masters of staining glass. The three lancets on the right hand side cover the principal subject of the window, the Assumption, whilst the lancet on the left acknowledges Hervé de La Palue, the donor of the window. The window also includes a depiction of Saint Michael fighting devils.

== Mural paintings ==
The church contains six murals by an unknown painter depicting the main events in the life of Saint Divy. They date to 1676.

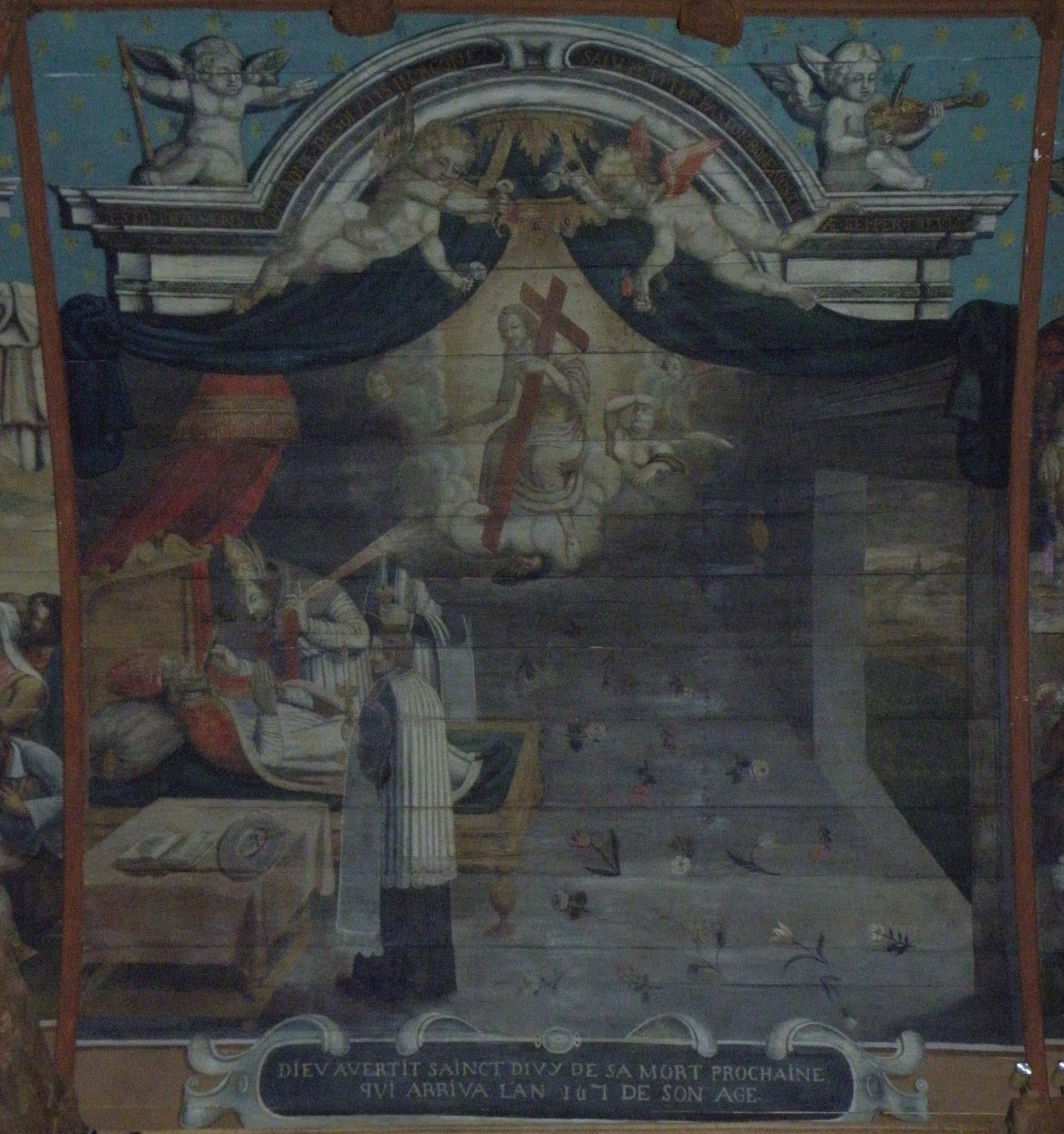
Saint Divy on his death bed. Part of one of the paintings on the vault panels in the roof of the Église Saint-Divy

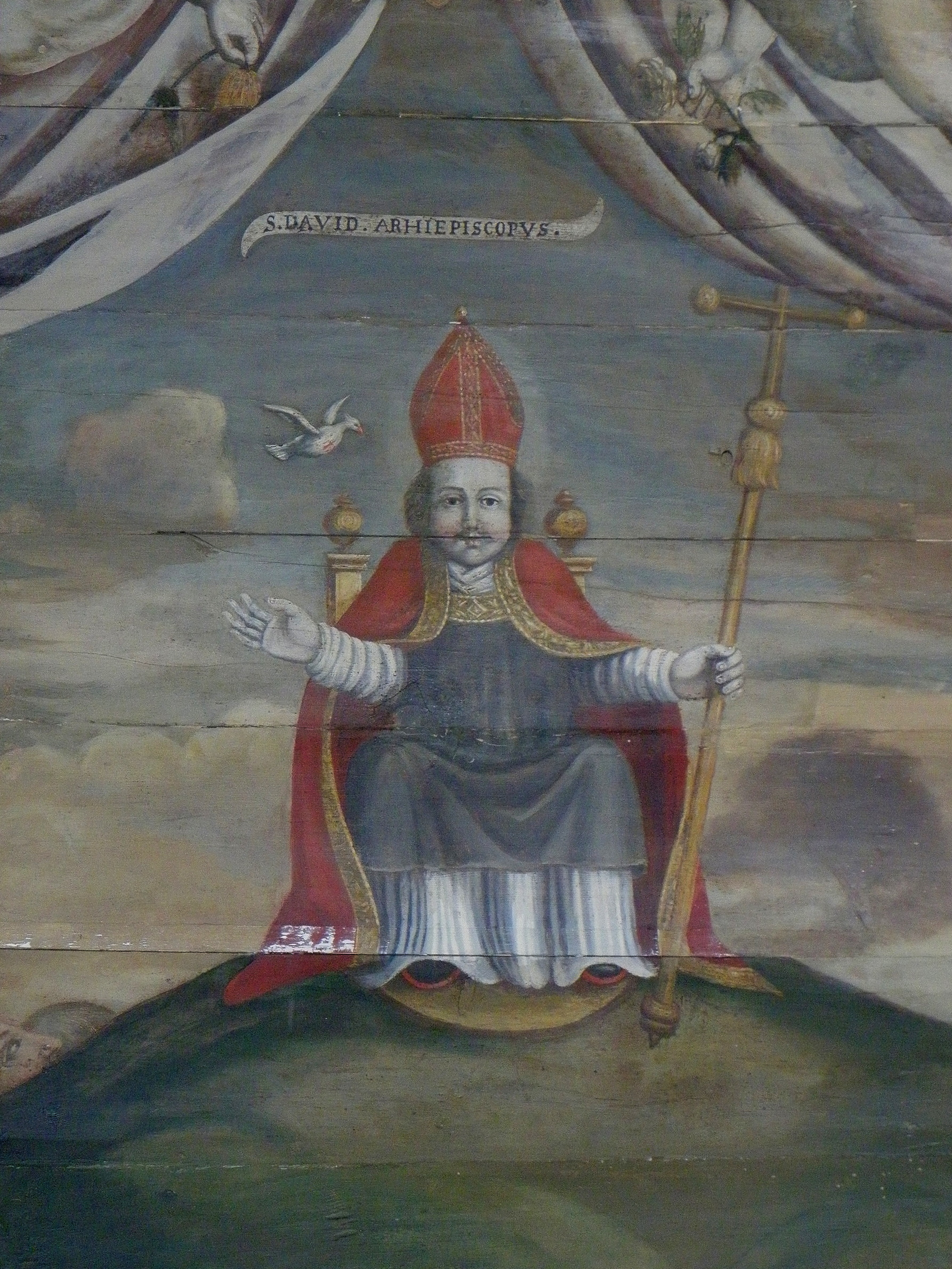
Detail from one of the St Divy murals.

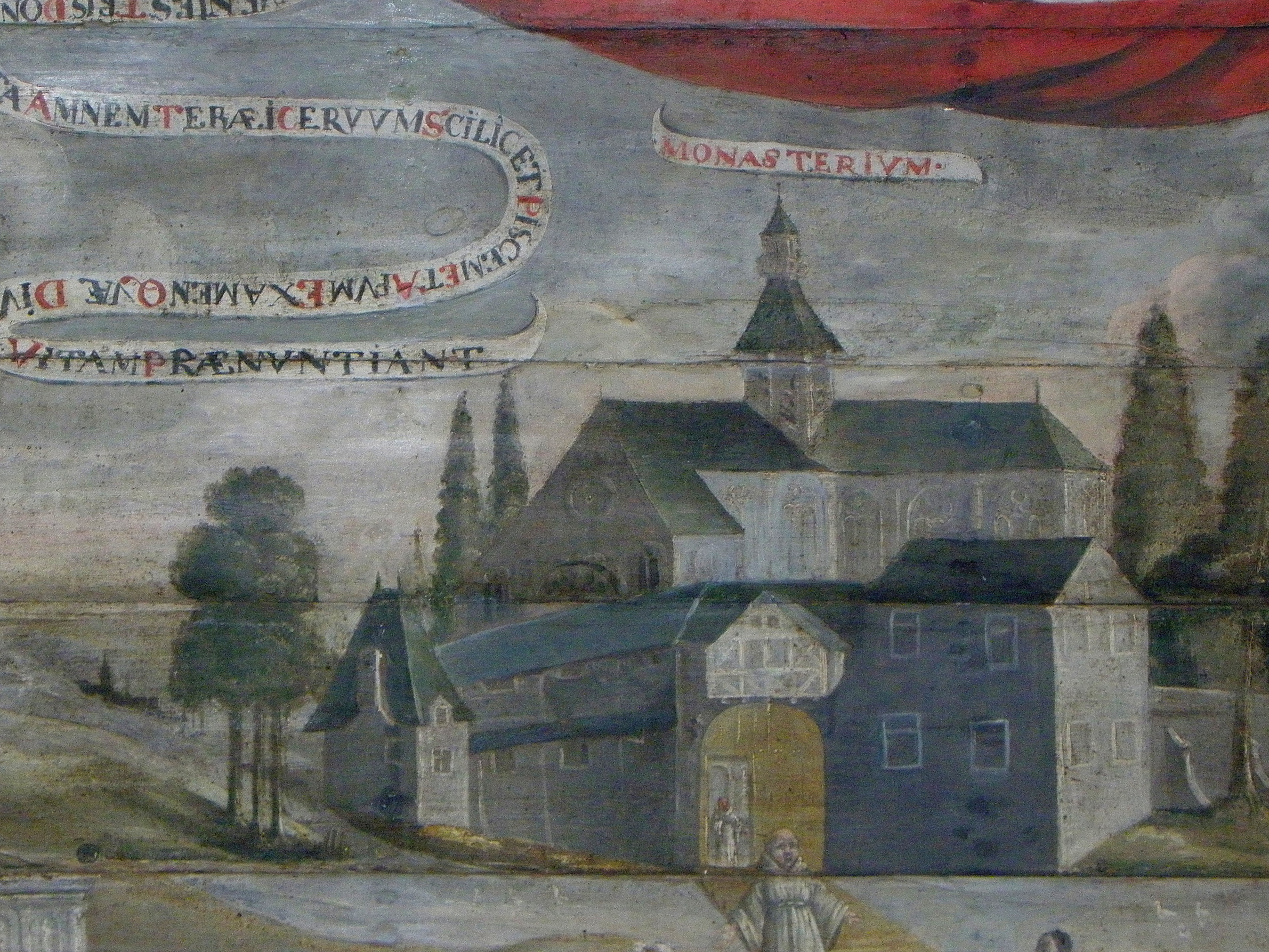
Part of the painting covering the announcement of Saint Divy's birth.

== Carpentry ==
The church has some examples of blochets and sablière.

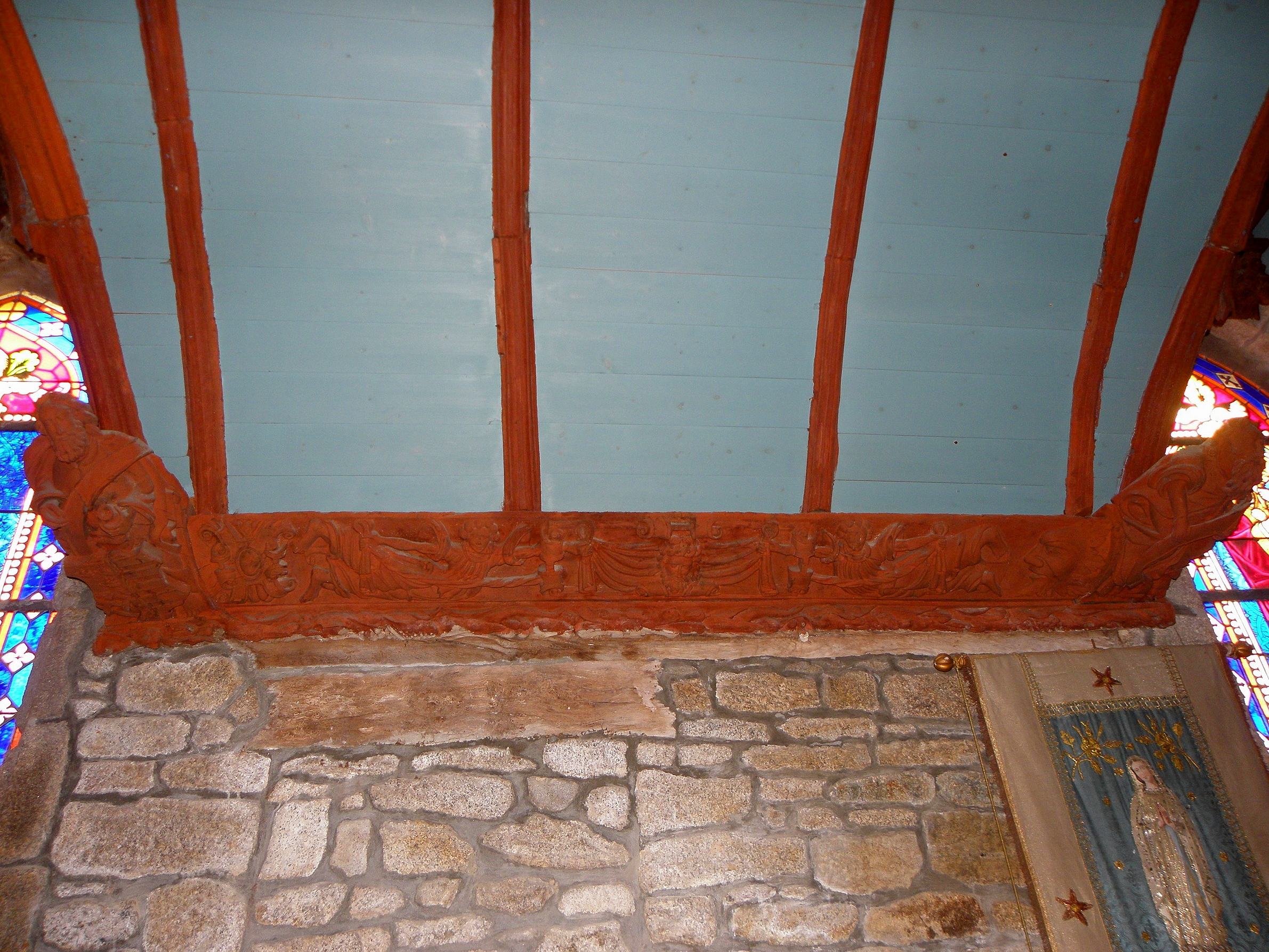

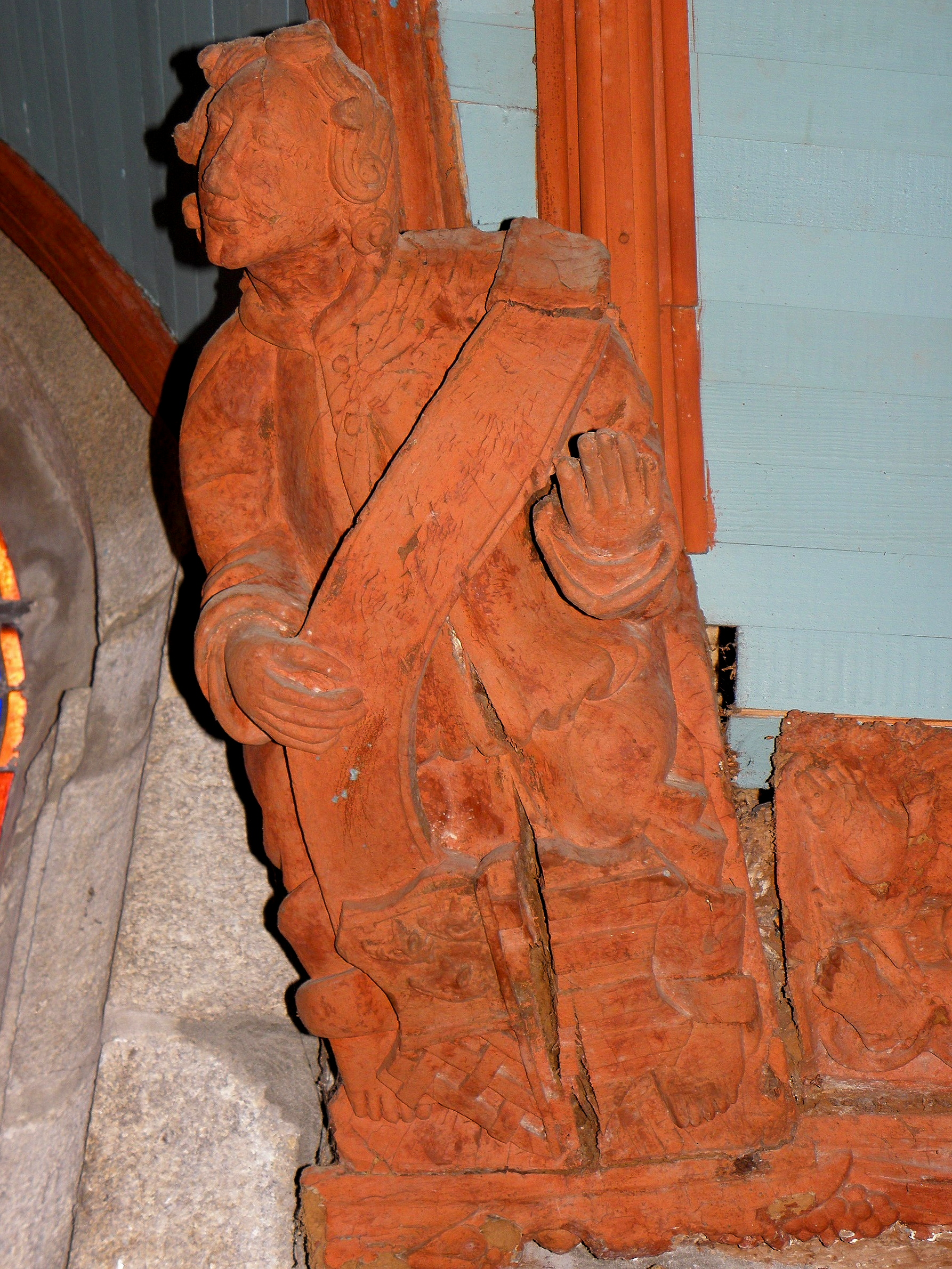
A Blochet
