= 609 =

Calendar year

609 in various calendars
Gregorian calendar	609; DCIX
Ab urbe condita	1362
Armenian calendar	58; ԹՎ ԾԸ
Assyrian calendar	5359
Balinese saka calendar	530–531
Bengali calendar	15–16
Berber calendar	1559
Buddhist calendar	1153
Burmese calendar	−29
Byzantine calendar	6117–6118
Chinese calendar	戊辰年 (Earth Dragon); 3306 or 3099 — to — 己巳年 (Earth Snake); 3307 or 3100
Coptic calendar	325–326
Discordian calendar	1775
Ethiopian calendar	601–602
Hebrew calendar	4369–4370
- Hindu calendars
Vikram Samvat	665–666
Shaka Samvat	530–531
Kali Yuga	3709–3710
Holocene calendar	10609
Iranian calendar	13 BP – 12 BP
Islamic calendar	13 BH – 12 BH
Japanese calendar	N/A
Javanese calendar	498–499
Julian calendar	609; DCIX
Korean calendar	2942
Minguo calendar	1303 before ROC 民前1303年
Nanakshahi calendar	−859
Seleucid era	920/921 AG
Thai solar calendar	1151–1152
Tibetan calendar	阳土龙年 (male Earth-Dragon); 735 or 354 or −418 — to — 阴土蛇年 (female Earth-Snake); 736 or 355 or −417

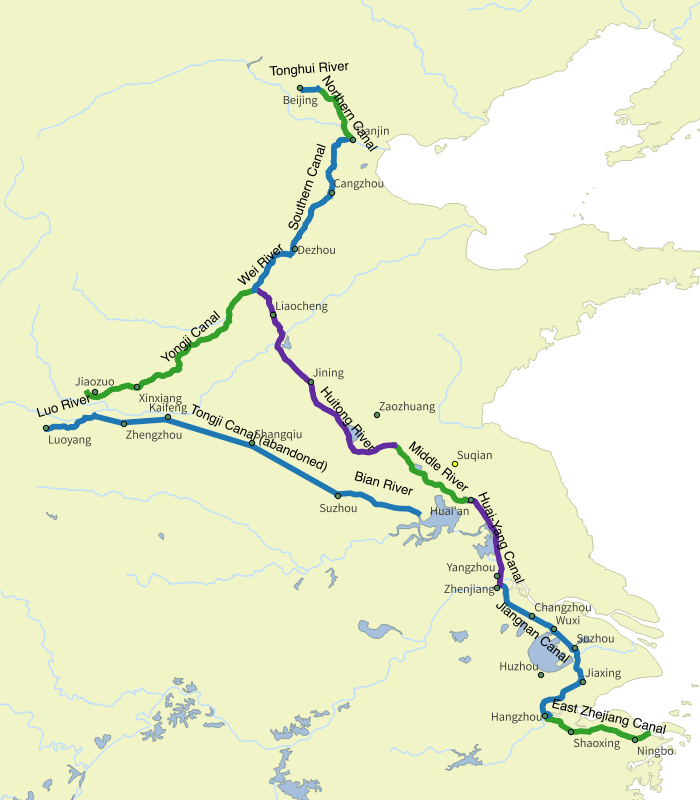
The course of the Grand Canal (China)

Year 609 (DCIX) was a common year starting on Wednesday of the Julian calendar. The denomination 609 for this year has been used since the early medieval period, when the Anno Domini calendar era became the prevalent method in Europe for naming years.

== Events ==
=== By place ===
==== Byzantine Empire ====
- Nicetas, cousin of future emperor Heraclius, launches an overland invasion in Egypt. He defeats a Byzantine army under Bonus (comes Orientis) outside Alexandria, sent from Constantinople.

==== Persia ====
- Battle of Dhi Qar: Arab tribesmen of Bakr ibn Wa'il defeat a Persian force (5,000 men), at a watering place near Kufa (Southern Iraq).

==== Asia ====
- Emperor Yángdi completes the Grand Canal; it provides an unbroken inland ship transport between the Yellow and Yangtze rivers. The canal network is 1,776 km (1,400 miles) long—linking five river systems—and extends from Beijing to the city of Hangzhou.
- The Sui dynasty government records a tax census of roughly 9 million registered households in the Chinese Empire, a population size of roughly 50 million people.
- Shibi Khan becomes the ninth ruler (khagan) of the Eastern Turkic Khaganate (approximate date).

=== By topic ===
==== Religion ====
- May 13 – The Pantheon in Rome is consecrated as "St. Mary and the Martyrs" (informally known as "Santa Maria Rotonda") by Pope Boniface IV (or 610).
- December 22 – Muhammad claims to have received what was to become the first wahy of Islam.

== Births ==
- Audoin, bishop of Rouen (d. 686)
- Hafsa bint Umar, wife of Muhammad (approximate date)

== Deaths ==
- Qamishoʿ, Syriac Orthodox Grand Metropolitan of the East.
- Venantius Fortunatus, Latin poet and bishop (or 600)
- Yang Lihua, empress of Northern Zhou (b. 561)
- Zuhayr bin Abi Sulma, Arabian poet (approx.)

== Sources ==
- MacDonald, William L. (1976). The Pantheon: Design, Meaning, and Progeny. Cambridge, MA: Harvard University Press. ISBN 0-674-01019-1.
