= Llanddewi Brefi =

Village and community in Ceredigion, Wales

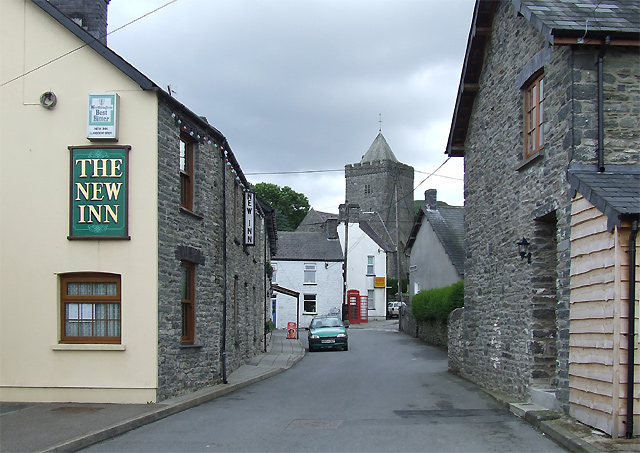
- Llanddewi Brefi

- Location within Ceredigion
- Population: 640 (2011)
- OS grid reference: SN662553
- Principal area: Ceredigion
- Preserved county: Dyfed
- Country: Wales
- Sovereign state: United Kingdom
- Post town: Tregaron
- Postcode district: SY25
- Dialling code: 01974
- Police: Dyfed-Powys
- Fire: Mid and West Wales
- Ambulance: Welsh
- UK Parliament: Ceredigion Preseli
- Senedd Cymru – Welsh Parliament: Ceredigion Penfro
- List of places UK Wales Ceredigion 52.1796°N 3.9568°W Community map: Map of the community

Llanddewi Brefi (Welsh pronunciation: [ɬanˈðɛwi ˈbrɛvi]) is a village, parish and community of approximately 500 people in Ceredigion, Wales. The village is notable for the famous Synod of Brefi held here in the sixth century. A number of miraculous events are said to have occurred during the synod, most notably by Saint David (Welsh: Dewi Sant), patron saint of Wales. Today, it is one of the largest parishes in Wales and lies 7 miles (11 km) north-east of Lampeter between Tregaron and Llanfair Clydogau. It is in the electoral ward of Llangeitho.

Llanddewi Brefi became a civil parish in 1934, from the merger of the following civil parishes: Doethie Camddwr, Doethie Pysgotwr, Garth and Ystrad, Gogoyan, Gorwydd, Llanio and Prysg and Carfan. In 1974 it became a community.

== Etymology ==
The village was anciently named Brefi, and the Latin name Bremia appears in the Ravenna Cosmography as a station on the route through Wales. The station and route are thought to refer to the Bremia Roman fort and the Sarn Helen respectively. This name was recorded by the antiquarian John Leland as Brevy, which he states is also the name of the small river that runs through the village and into the Teifi. As such it is believed that both the Roman fort and the historic village take their names from an ancient Celtic name for the river meaning "a bubbling stream".

The name is subject to a number of folk tales which derives it from an old legend that two oxen (sometimes the "Ychain Bannog" of Hu Gadarn in Welsh mythology) were hauling stone for the construction of the church. The difficult terrain meant that the oxen had to ascend a steep hill named Foelallt on each journey. On one of these journeys one of the burdened oxen collapsed and died with either the dying ox, or its partner bellowing nine times. The bellowing was so powerful that it split the hill in two, allowing the surviving ox an easier route, and the church was thus completed. As such, the place became known as "Brefi" (which means "bellow" in Welsh).

Since the Synod of Brefi in around 545 the village has been known as Llanddewi Brefi, meaning "the Llan (an ancient holy place) of Saint David at Brefi." As such, the oxen folk tale is sometimes retold as "Dau Ychain Dewi" (The two oxen of St David), most notably in the twelfth century poem Canu y Dewi, by Gwynfardd Brycheiniog.

== History ==
=== Roman Bremia ===
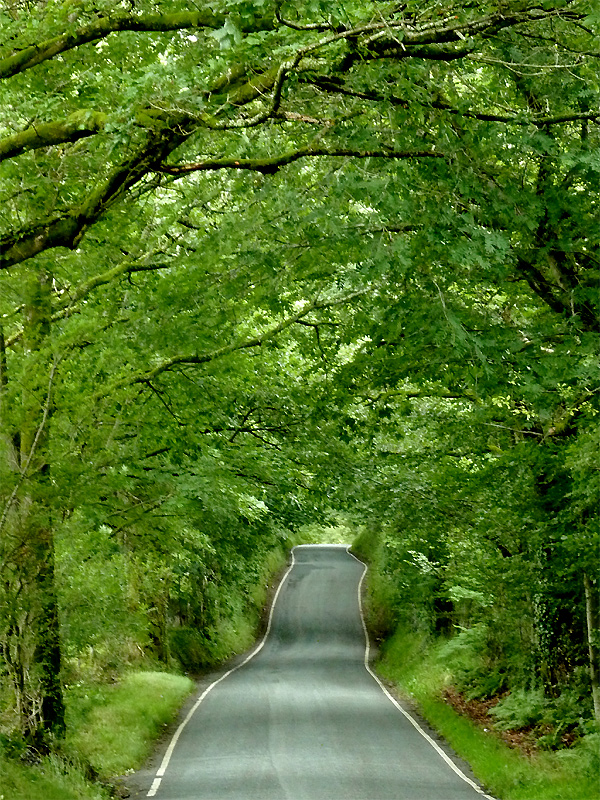
The Sarn Helen near Llandewi Brefi. The Roman fort of Bremia was built as a station along this route.

In the British Iron Age, the area formed part of the tribal lands of the Demetae or possibly the Ordovices. Romans activity in the area is evidenced by the construction of a square auxiliary fort around AD 73 -77, close to a crossing point of the river for which it was named. The fort was a station on a Roman road known in later Welsh tradition as the Sarn Helen, leading north from Luentinum, the fort at Dolaucothi.

The Romans occupied the fort with around 500 soldiers until withdrawing around fifty years later. Despite this short occupation a settlement of around a thousand civilians is thought to have developed, as evidenced by the extensive archeological evidence and the presence of a Thermae (Roman bathhouse). Two of five inscribed stones found in the area indicate that the fort's garrison included soldiers from the Cohors II Astrium, a military unit from Asturias, Spain. Around AD 424, the area was conquered by Ceredig (traditionally said to be the Great-Grandfather of Saint David), and became part of the new Kingdom of Ceredigion.

=== Synod of Brefi ===
In the early sixth century, the village was the location for a convocation of leading figures in the Celtic Church to discuss the church's response to the Pelagian heresy. Medieval Welsh writing would record this synod, as a central event in the lives of many Welsh saints, including Saint Paulinus, Saint Deiniol, Saint Cybi, Saint Dubricius, and Saint David. A number of miracles and notable occurrences are attributed to this synod, most notably the ground underneath the young Saint David miraculously raised up under his feet, so that he may be better heard among the church elders and address the large crowd gathered there. This event is said to have taken place on the small hill where St. Davids church now stands.

This miracle and David's speech was said to have had impressed the senior bishop, Saint Dubricius so much that he gifted David the ancient Metropolitan See of Caerleon (which David subsequently moved to St Davids), and retired to Bardsey Island.

=== Later medieval period ===
In the eleventh and twelfth centuries the area was the scene of much fighting both against the invading Normans and between the established Kingdom of Powys and Deheubarth. In 1073, a particularly bloody battle was fought at Llanddewi Brefi in which the Powysian forces (led by the sons of Cadwgan ap Bleddyn, Gronw and Llewelyn) were victorious against Rhŷs ap Owain of Deheubarth (who they believed had murdered their grandfather, Bleddyn ap Cynfyn). The Norman Bishop of St Davids also established an ecclesiastical college in the village in honour of their patron saint.

== St David's Church ==
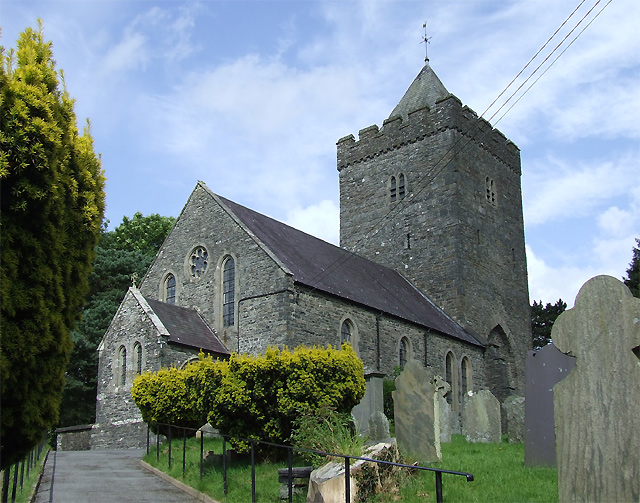
St. David's church stands on a small hill said to be the one miraculously raised under Saint David's feet.

The church site is associated with religious worship since the 7th century and fragments of even older buildings are incorporated into the church building and its grounds. The construction of the Norman church is credited to Thomas Bek, Bishop of St Davids, who built it as a collegiate church for the establishment which he is said to have founded here in 1187.

== Modern village ==
In addition to the Anglican church, there is a non-conformist chapel, two pubs and one village shop. The village and the surrounding area are largely Welsh-speaking and the local economy is dominated by sheep and dairy farming.

Pont Gogoyan is a bridge over the River Teifi, one mile (1.6 km) to the south-west of the village and within the parish. The bridge has five stone arches and was built in the 18th century. It is a Grade II* listed structure.

In 1977 the village was the scene of one of the world's biggest ever raids involving the drug LSD. Over six million tabs of the drug were seized as part of Operation Julie on 26 March of that year.

The village is the home of the character Daffyd Thomas in the television comedy series Little Britain. The popularity of the show led to tourists visiting to be photographed next to the village's road signs; several of the signs were stolen and listed for sale in 2005.

== Notable people ==
- Robert Daniell (1646–1718), governor of the Province of South Carolina
- Sir David Davies (1792–1865), physician to King William IV and Queen Adelaide.
- John D. Davies (1795–1861), priest, honorary canon of Durham Cathedral from 1853
- Evan Evans (1804–1886), a dissenting minister, known as Evans bach Nantyglo.
- Adrian Monk (1917-2004), politician, known for his involvement in the Falkland Islands war
- D. Ben Rees (born 1937), publisher, author, lecturer and minister in the Presbyterian Church of Wales
- Gethin Davies (born 1992), musician, drummer in The Struts
