= Synod of Brefi =

6th century Welsh church council

The Synod of Brefi was a church council held at Llanddewi Brefi in Ceredigion, Wales, around 545.

The synod was apparently called in order to condemn the heretical teachings of Pelagius. It was an important milestone in the rise of Saint David. It was Paulinus who advised Saint Dubricius, the senior bishop there, to invite David, a minor abbot, to the synod. David kept aloof from all temporal concerns and was initially reluctant to attend. St David's Church, Llanddewi Brefi is the site associated with St David's best known miracle, when, according to tradition, the ground rose up under his feet as he addressed the large crowd so that he could be heard better.

According to legend, David's words were so eloquent that Dubricius retired in David's favour.

One of his first duties was to consecrate Saint Deiniol as Bishop of Bangor. It is also said that the synod was called while Saint Cadoc, Abbot of Llancarfan, was away in Brittany. In disgust, he refused to return for many years.

Saint Cybi is said to have attended the Synod and advised some pilgrims on their journey to Ynys Enlli (Bardsey).

The Brefi synod was followed by the "Synod of Victory" at Caerleon around 569.
