= Synod of Victory =

The Synod of Victory (Synod of the Grove of Victory, Synod of Caerleon) was a church council held in Caerleon, Wales, around AD 569. While some sources say it was a continuation of the Synod of Brefi to condemn the heresy of Pelagianism, others, such as Baring-Gould, say it was in regards to penitential canons.

In 550, Saint David attended the Synod of Brefi and spoke against Pelagianism. His speech led his fellow monks to elect him primate of the region. As primate he presided over the synod at Caerleon around 569. The synod ratified the canons and decrees of Brefi as well as a code of rules which he had drawn up for the regulation of the British Church, a copy of which remained in the Cathedral of S. David's until it was lost in an incursion of pirates.
