= Jñānagupta =

Gandharan Buddhist monk and scriptural translator

Chinese name
- Traditional Chinese: 闍那崛多
- Simplified Chinese: 阇那崛多
Transcriptions
Standard Mandarin
- Hanyu Pinyin: Shénàjuéduō

Also known as:
- Chinese: 志德
Transcriptions
Standard Mandarin
- Hanyu Pinyin: Zhì Dé

Sanskrit name
- Sanskrit: ज्ञानगुप्त

Jñānagupta (Sanskrit: ज्ञानगुप्त; Chinese: 闍那崛多 or 志德; pinyin: Shénàjuéduō or Zhì Dé) was a Buddhist monk from Gandhara who travelled to China and was recognised by Emperor Wen of the Sui dynasty. He is said to have brought with him 260 sutras in Sanskrit, and was supported in translating these into Chinese by the emperor.

In total, he translated 39 scriptures in 192 fascicles during the period 561 to 592, including:

- Sutra of Buddha's Fundamental Deeds, 60 fascicles

(Chinese: 佛本行經; pinyin: Fó Běnháng Jīng)

- Candrottaradarikapariprccha, 2 fascicles

(Chinese: 月上女經; pinyin: Yuè Shàng Nǚ Jīng)
