= 7th century =

One hundred years, from 601 to 700

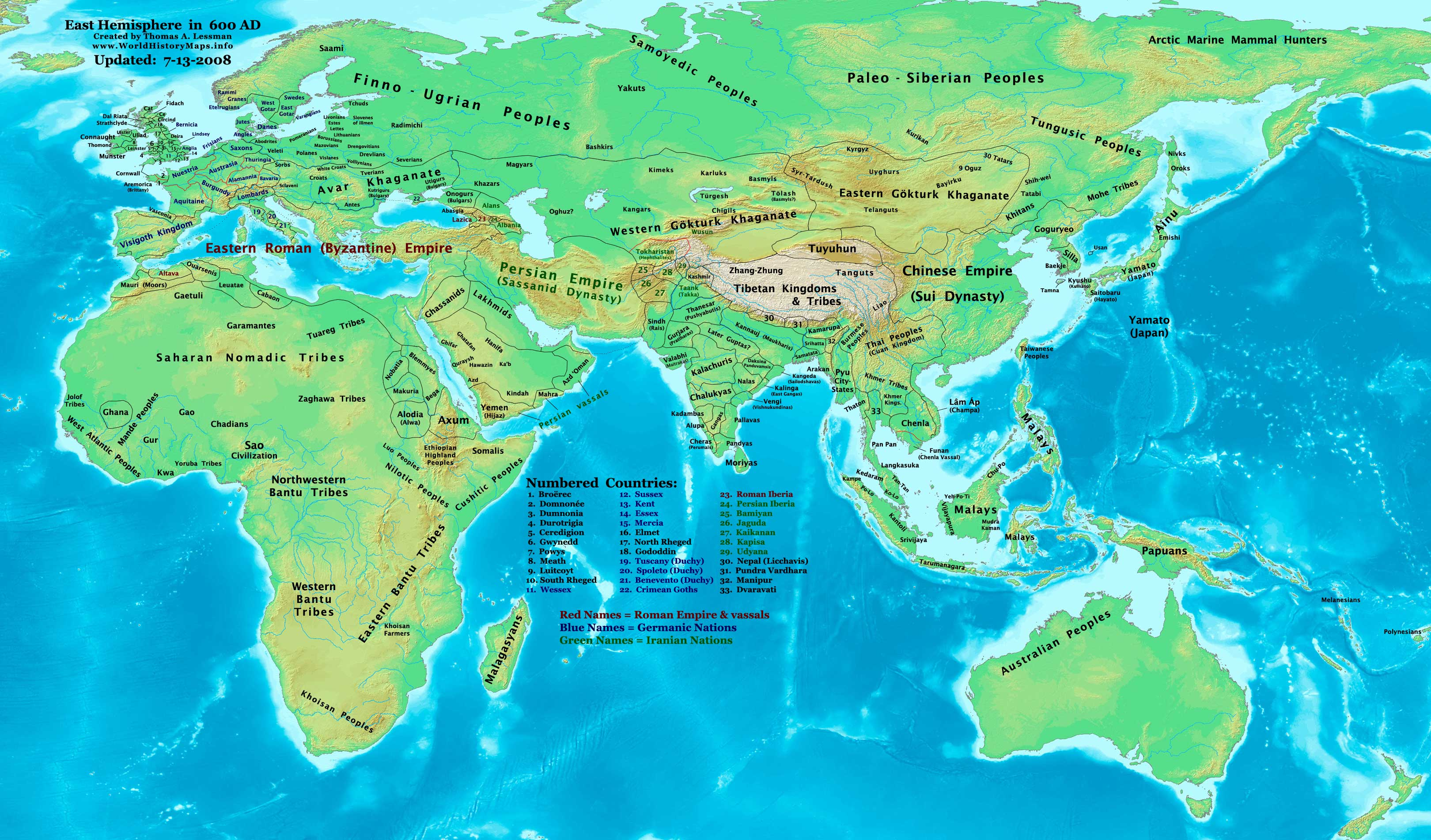
Eastern Hemisphere at the beginning of the 7th century.

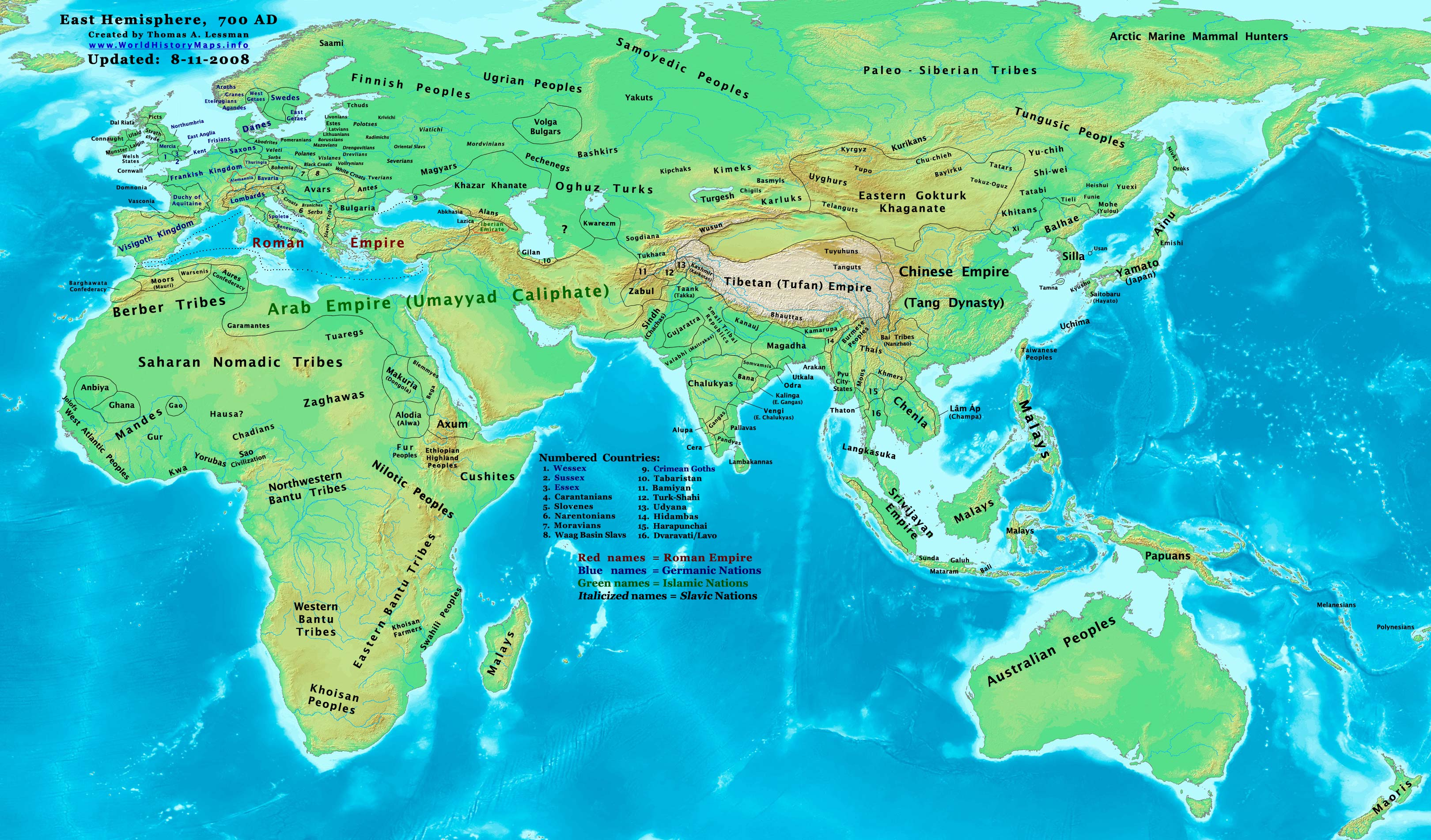
Eastern Hemisphere at the end of the 7th century.

The 7th century is the period from 601 through 700 in accordance with the Julian calendar in the Christian Era.

The spread of Islam and the Muslim conquests began with the unification of Arabia by the Islamic prophet Muhammad starting in 622. After Muhammad's death in 632, Islam expanded beyond the Arabian Peninsula under the Rashidun Caliphate (632–661) and the Umayyad Caliphate (661–750). The Muslim conquest of Persia in the 7th century led to the downfall of the Sasanian Empire. Also conquered during the 7th century were Syria, Palestine, Armenia, Egypt, and North Africa.

The Byzantine Empire suffered setbacks during the rapid expansion of the Caliphate and a mass incursion of Slavs in the Balkans which reduced its territorial limits. The decisive victory at the Siege of Constantinople in the 670s led the empire to retain Asia Minor, which ensured the existence of the empire.

In the Iberian Peninsula, the 7th century was known as the Siglo de Concilios (century of councils) referring to the Councils of Toledo. Northumbria established dominance in the British Isles from Mercia, while the Lombards maintained their hold in most of Italy.

In China, the Sui dynasty was replaced by the Tang dynasty, which set up its military bases from Korea to Central Asia. China began to reach its height. Silla allied itself with the Tang dynasty, subjugating Baekje and defeating Goguryeo to unite the Korean Peninsula under one ruler. The Asuka period persisted in Japan throughout the 7th century.

Harsha united Northern India, which had reverted to small republics and states after the fall of the Gupta Empire in the 6th century.

== Events ==
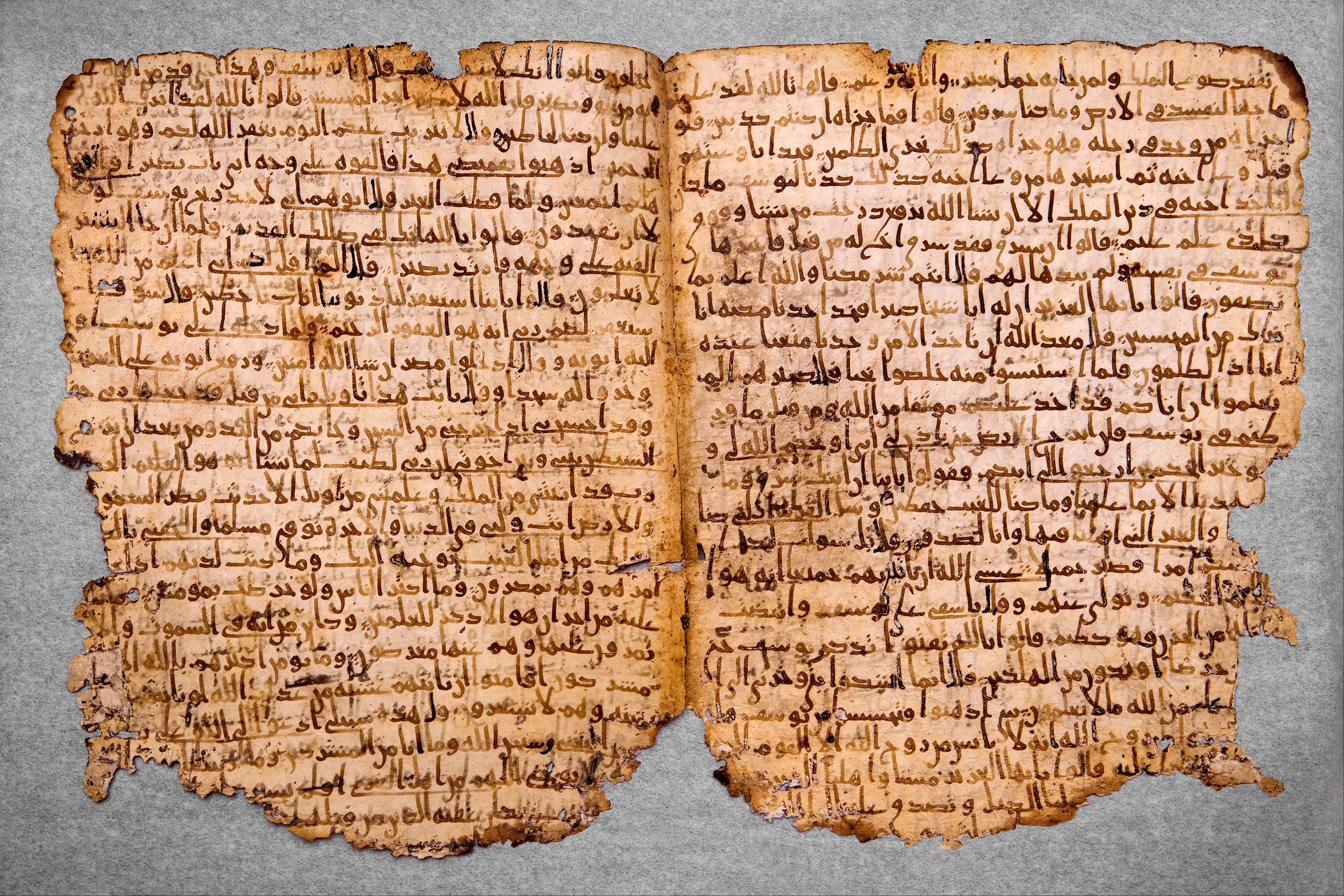
Pages of a late 7th century Quran

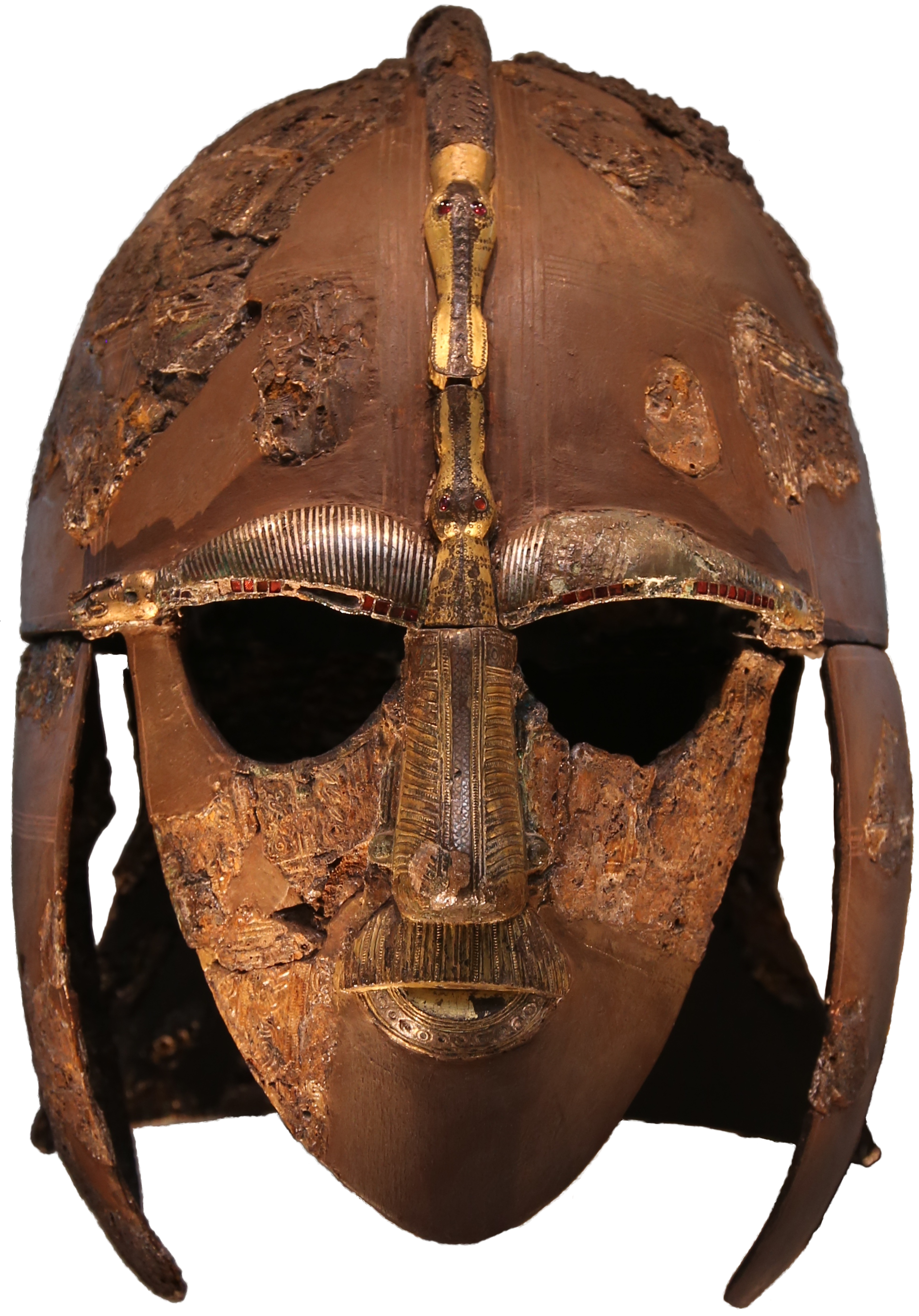
An Anglo-Saxon helmet found at Sutton Hoo, probably belonging to Rædwald of East Anglia circa 625.

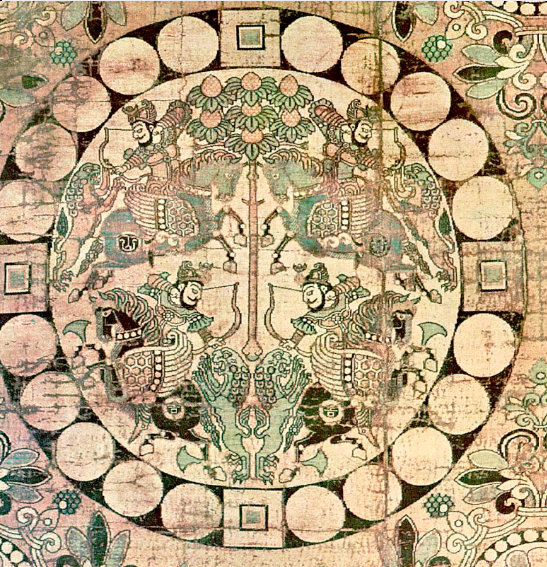
Silk cloth with four horsemen hunting lions, 7th century. Horyu-ji temple, Japan.

- The world's population shrinks to about 208 million people (from 257 million in 200 AD)
- The Anglo-Saxon Heptarchy emerges at the beginning of this century or the last in England.
- Sutton Hoo ship burial, East Anglia, England.
- Earliest attested English poetry.
- The first known Croatian archon, Porga, establishes the Duchy of Croatia.
- The Bulgars arrive in the Balkans; establishment of the powerful Bulgarian Empire.
- Xuanzang traveled from China to India, before returning to Chang'an in China to translate Buddhist scriptures.
- Guangzhou, China, becomes a major international seaport, hosting maritime travelers from the Middle East, East Africa, India, and South East Asia.
- The main compound of Hōryū-ji temple in Nara is built during the Asuka period.
- Timgad, Algeria, is destroyed by Berbers.
- Islam originates from the Arabian Peninsula; the Quran is documented.
- Nobatia annexed by its southern neighbor Makuria sometime before the Arab-Nubian wars.
- Arab traders penetrate the area of Lake Chad.
- End of sporadic Buddhist rule in the Sindh.
- Teotihuacan is sacked. The political and religious buildings are burned.
- The religion of Shugendō evolves from Buddhism, Taoism, Shinto and other influences in the mountains of Japan.
- Early 7th century: Croats enter their present territory, settling in six distinct tribal delimitations.
- 7th and 9th century: Mosaics and side panels above the apse of Basilica of Sant'Apollinare in Classe are made.
- 600: Smallpox spreads from India into Europe.
- 602: The Third Chinese domination of Vietnam starts following the collapse of the Early Lý dynasty.
- 603: Last mention of the Roman Senate in Gregorian Register. It mentions that the senate acclaimed the statues of emperor Phocas and empress Leontia.
- 606: Pope Boniface III elected to the papacy on the death of Pope Sabinian. He sought and obtained a decree from Byzantine Emperor Phocas which stated that "the See of Blessed Peter the Apostle should be the head of all the Churches". This ensured that the title of "Universal Bishop" belonged exclusively to the Bishop of Rome.
- 607: Hōryū-ji temple believed to have been completed in Ikaruga, Japan.
- 610: A great number of Slavs enter the Roman lands of the Balkans. Later forming tribal confederacies.
- 610: Heraclius arrives by ship from Carthage at Constantinople, overthrows Phocas and becomes Byzantine Emperor. His first major act is to change the official language of the Byzantine Empire from Latin to Greek (already the language of the vast majority of the population).
- 615: The Sasanian Empire under Shah Khosrow II sacks Jerusalem, taking away the relic of the True Cross.
- 615: Pacal the Great becomes king of the Mayan city-state of Palenque.
- 616: Sasanian shah Khosrow II invades Egypt.
- 616: Æthelfrith of Northumbria defeats the Welsh in a battle at Chester in England.
- 618: Tang dynasty of China initiated by Li Yuan.
- 618: The Chenla kingdom completely absorbed Funan.
- 622: Year one of the Islamic calendar begins, during which the Hijrah occurs—Muhammad and his followers emigrate from Mecca to Medina in September.
- 623: The Frankish merchant Samo, supporting the Slavs fighting their Avar rulers, becomes the new ruler of the first known Slav state in Central Europe.
- 626: The Avars, the Slavs and the Persians jointly besiege but fail to capture Constantinople.
- 627: Emperor Heraclius defeats the Persians, ending the Roman–Persian Wars.
- 629: The Arab–Byzantine wars begin. Much of the Eastern Roman Empire is conquered by Muslim Arabs led by Khalid ibn al-Walid.
- 629–630: Tang campaign against the Eastern Turks, Chinese Tang dynasty forces under commanders Li Jing and Li Shiji destroy the Göktürk Khanate.
- 632: The Muslim conquests begin.
- 635–649: Alopen, a Persian Christian priest, introduces Nestorian Christianity into China.
- 636: Around this time the Battle of al-Qadisiyyah resulted in a decisive victory for Muslims in the Muslim conquest of Persia, the Persian Empire is conquered by Muslim Arabs led by Sa'd ibn Abi Waqqas.
- 638: Emperor Taizong (627–649) issues an edict of universal toleration of religions; Nestorian Christians build a church in Chang'an.
- 638: Muslim conquest of Palestine.
- 639: Muslim conquest of Egypt and Armenia.
- 639: Unsuccessful revolt of Ashina Jiesheshuai of the Turkic people against Tang China.
- 641: The Coptic period, in its more specific definition, ends when Islam is introduced into Egypt.
- 642: Arab armies face first Defeat in The First Battle of Dongola against Christian Nubians
- 649–683: Chinese Emperor Gaozong permits establishment of Christian monasteries in each of 358 prefectures.
- 650: The Arab–Khazar wars begin.

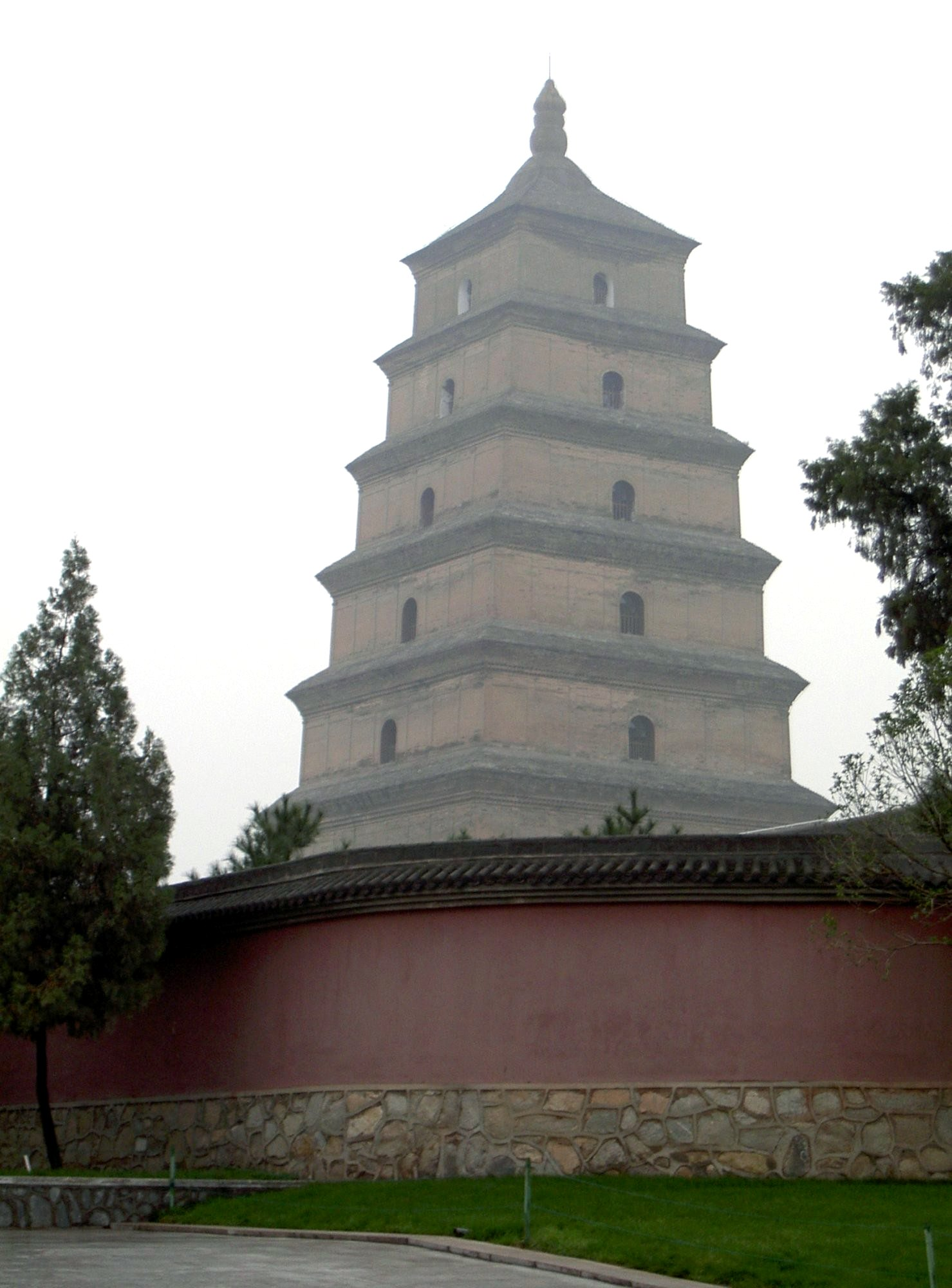
The Tang dynasty Giant Wild Goose Pagoda of Chang'an, built in 652, in modern-day Xi'an, China.

- Mid-7th century: Durga Mahishasura-mardini (Durga as Slayer of the Buffalo Demon), rock-cut relief, Mamallapuram, Tamil Nadu, India, is made. Pallava period. It is now kept at Asian Art Archives, University of Michigan, Ann Arbor.
- Mid-7th century: Portrait of Lord Pacal, from his tomb, Temple of the Inscriptions, Palenque, Mexico, is made. Maya culture. It is now kept at National Museum of Anthropology, Mexico City.
- Mid-7th century: Dharmaraja Ratha, Mamallapuram, Tamil Nadu, India, is built. Pallava period.
- 651: Emperor Yazdegerd III is murdered in Merv, ending the rule of Sassanid dynasty in Persia.
- 652: Arab armies defeated again in the Second Battle of Dongola resulting in the baqt possibly the longest treaty in history.
- 656–661: The First Fitna occurs.
- 657: The Chinese Tang dynasty under Emperor Gaozong of Tang defeats Western Turkic Kaganate.
- 658: Two Chinese monks, Zhi Yu and Zhi You, reconstruct the 3rd century south-pointing chariot mechanical compass-vehicle for Emperor Tenji of Japan.
- 661: Caliph Ali ibn Abi Talib is assassinated. His successor Hasan ibn Ali abdicated the Caliphate to Muawiyah I, marking the beginning of the Umayyad Caliphate.
- 663: The Tang dynasty of China and Korean Silla Kingdom gain victory against the Korean Baekje Kingdom and their Yamato Japanese allies in the naval Battle of Baekgang.
- 664: Conquest of Kabul by Muslims.
- 664: A Tang dynasty Chinese source written by I-tsing, mentioned about Holing (Kalingga) kingdom, located somewhere in the northern coast of Central Java.
- 668: The end of the Goguryeo–Tang War, as Goguryeo fell to a joint attack by Tang China and Unified Silla of Korea, the latter of which held the former Goguryeo domains.
- 670: In 670 an Arab Muslim army under Uqba ibn Nafi entered the region of Ifriqiya. In the late 670s conquest of North Africa was completed.
- 671: I-tsing visited Srivijaya and Malayu in Sumatra and Kedah in Malay peninsula on his way to Nalanda, India.
- 674: The first Arab siege of Constantinople begins.
- 677: Most of the Arab fleet is destroyed by Greek fire; the Persian crown prince flees to the T'ang court.
- 680: Decisive victory of the Bulgars over the Byzantines in the Battle of Ongal.
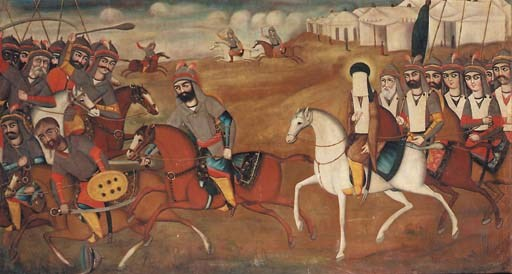
  Qajar era painting of Muhammad at the Battle of Karbala in 680
- 680: Battle of Karbala took place near Kufa, which resulted in the death of Husayn ibn Ali and the division of Muslim community.
- 681: Bulgaria is recognized as an independent country by the Byzantine Empire.
- 682: Revival of the Turkic Khaganate by the efforts of Ilterish Qaghan and Tonyukuk
- 683: Dapunta Hyang Sri Jayanasa performed Siddhayatra as the journey to expand his influence. The event mentioned in several inscriptions such as Telaga Batu inscription, Talang Tuo inscription and Kedukan Bukit inscription. The beginning of Srivijaya hegemony over the maritime region around Malacca Strait and Sunda Strait.
- 683–685: The Second Fitna.
- 686: Srivijaya launch a naval invasion of Java, which is mentioned in Kota Kapur inscription. This likely contributed to the end of Tarumanagara kingdom.
  Mutual exhaustion from the Byzantine–Sasanian War (602–628) left both empires vulnerable to the early Muslim conquests.
- 687: I-tsing returned to Srivijaya on his way back from India to China. In his record he reported that the Kingdom of Malayu was captured by Srivijaya.
- 688: Emperor Justinian II of the Byzantine Empire defeats the Bulgarians.
- 690: Pro-Buddhist imperial consort Wu Zetian seizes power and rules as Empress of China.
- 691: Buddhism is made the state religion of China.
- 698: The Arabs capture Carthage from the Byzantine Empire.
- 698: Active but unofficial anti-Christian persecution begins in China
- 698: North–South States Period begins in Korea.
- 700: The Mount Edziza volcanic complex erupts in northern British Columbia, Canada.
- 700: The Sumatra-based Srivijaya naval kingdom flourishes and declines.
- 700: Wet-field rice cultivation, small towns and kingdoms flourish. Trade links are established with China and India.
- c. late 7th century: The Sojomerto inscription (discovered in Batang, Central Java) is dated around this time, it mentions Dapunta Selendra, possibly the ancestor of the Sailendra dynasty. The inscription was written in Old Malay, suggesting a Srivijayan link to this family.

== Inventions, discoveries, introductions ==
- Earliest known record of the game Chaturanga, a predecessor to Chess.
- The Indian Mathematician Brahmagupta presented the first instance of finite difference interpolation.
- 636: The Xumi Pagoda in Zhengding, China is built.
- 650: The first Chinese paper money is issued.
- 650s: After sailing from Ethiopia, Sa'd ibn Abi Waqqas allegedly introduced Islam to China, and established the first Islamic mosque of China in Guangzhou.
- 670s: Greek fire invented in Constantinople.
- Late 7th century: The stirrup introduced to Persia from China.
- In the 7th century the cookie was invented in Persia.

=== Inventions ===
- 619: Toothbrush in China during the Tang dynasty
- 672: Greek fire in Constantinople, Byzantine Empire: Greek fire, an incendiary weapon likely based on petroleum or naphtha, is invented by Kallinikos, a Lebanese Greek refugee from Baalbek, as described by Theophanes. However, the historicity and exact chronology of this account is dubious, and it could be that Kallinikos merely introduced an improved version of an established weapon.
- 7th century: Banknote in Tang dynasty China: The banknote is first developed in China during the Tang and Song dynasties, starting in the 7th century. Its roots are in merchant receipts of deposit during the Tang dynasty (618–907), as merchants and wholesalers desire to avoid the heavy bulk of copper coinage in large commercial transactions.
- 7th century: Porcelain in Tang dynasty China: True porcelain is manufactured in northern China from roughly the beginning of the Tang dynasty in the 7th century, while true porcelain was not manufactured in southern China until about 300 years later, during the early 10th century.

== Sources ==
- Pryor, John H.; Jeffreys, Elizabeth M. (2006), The Age of the ΔΡΟΜΩΝ: The Byzantine Navy ca. 500–1204, Brill Academic Publishers, ISBN 978-9004151970
- Roland, Alex (1992), "Secrecy, Technology, and War: Greek Fire and the Defense of Byzantium", Technology and Culture, 33 (4): 655–679, doi:10.2307/3106585, JSTOR 3106585, S2CID 113017993
- Theophanes; Turtledove, Harry (Transl.) (1982), The chronicle of Theophanes: an English translation of anni mundi 6095–6305 (A.D. 602–813), University of Pennsylvania Press, ISBN 978-0812211283
