= San Giovanni Domnarum =

Church building in Pavia, Italy

San Giovanni Domanarum
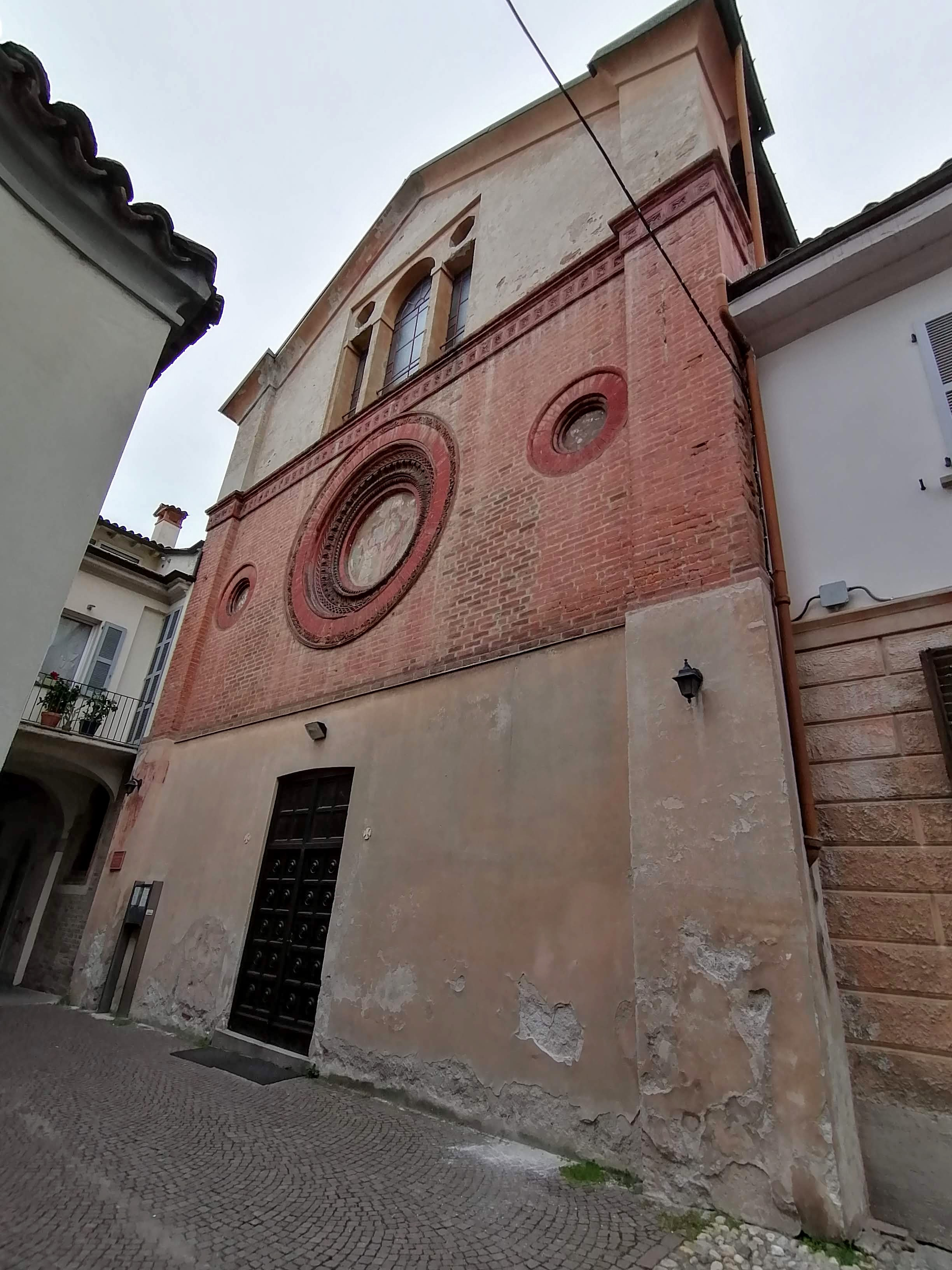

Religion
- Affiliation: Catholic
- Province: Pavia
- Year consecrated: 654
- Status: Active

Location
- Location: Pavia, Italy
- Interactive map of San Giovanni Domanarum
- Coordinates: 45°11′11.45″N 9°9′9.8″E

Architecture
- Type: Church
- Completed: 17th Century

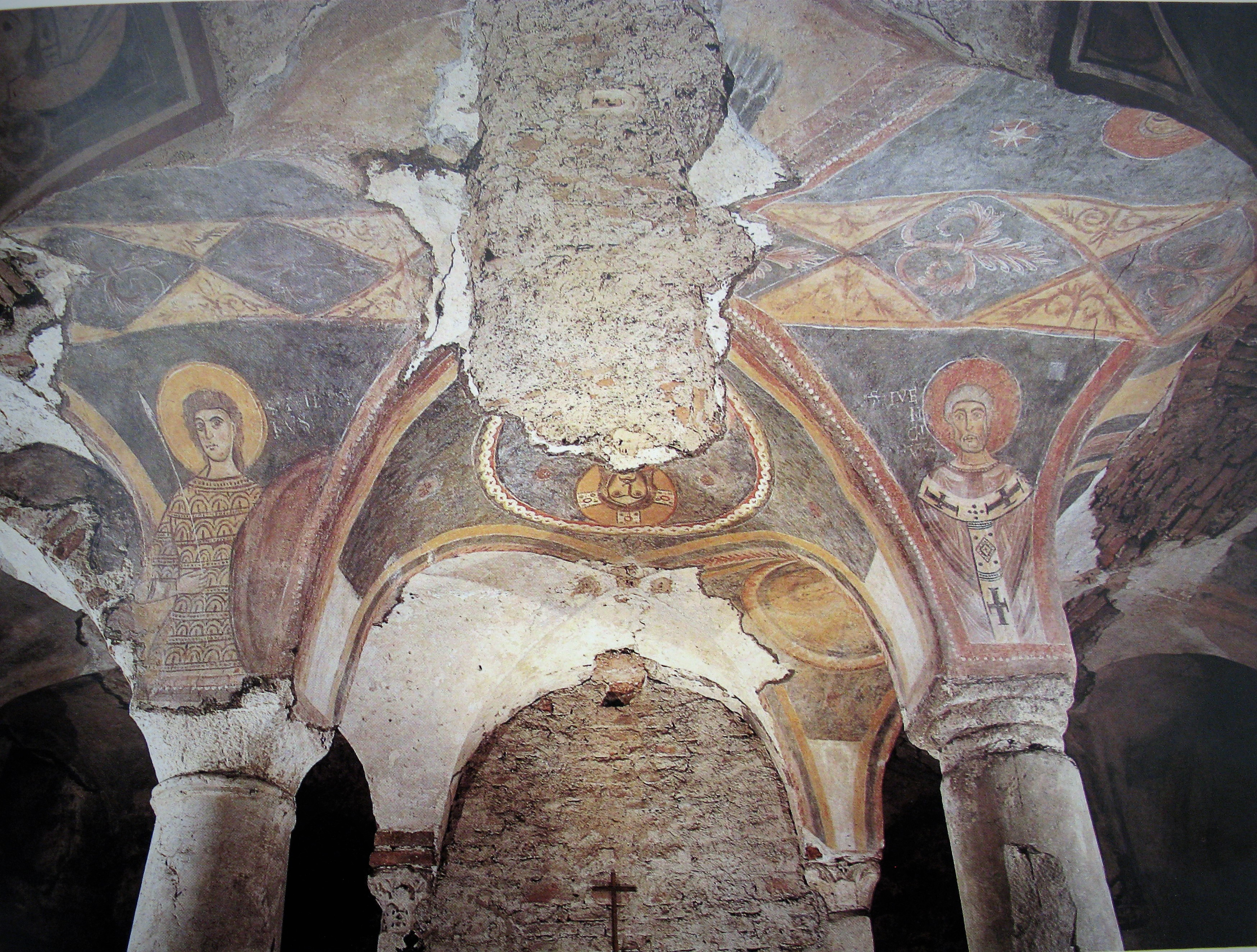
Frescoes in the crypt, 12th century

The church of San Giovanni Domnarum is one of the oldest in Pavia. In the crypt, which was rediscovered after centuries in 1914, remains of frescoes are visible.

== History ==
The church was founded (over the remains of a Roman bath building) around the year 654 at the behest of Gundeberga, wife of Rothari and Arioald and daughter of Queen Theodelinda and Agilulf to accommodate her burial or to be the seat of the spring. baptismal of females, hence the title to St. John the Baptist and the specification domnarum (i.e. "of women"). Perhaps King Rothari was buried in the church. It is probably the first Catholic church erected by the Lombard kings in the city of Pavia. The church had a prominent role in the city panorama until about the year 1000, also thanks to the patrimonial endowment that had been assigned to it by the founder.

Between the ninth and tenth centuries a copious series of imperial diplomas were issued for the church, in which the foundation of Gundiperga is mentioned, while in an act of the bishop of Pavia Bernard I of 1129 the "pro anima" masses of Queen Gundeberga are attested. they were still celebrated in the church. In 1611 the provost Torriani, wishing to adapt the Romanesque building to the liturgical needs that emerged from the Council of Trent, undertook building interventions that heavily influenced the appearance of the building: the three naves were partially demolished and the church became a single hall, with side chapels. Instead, the crypt and the bell tower remained intact.

== Architecture ==
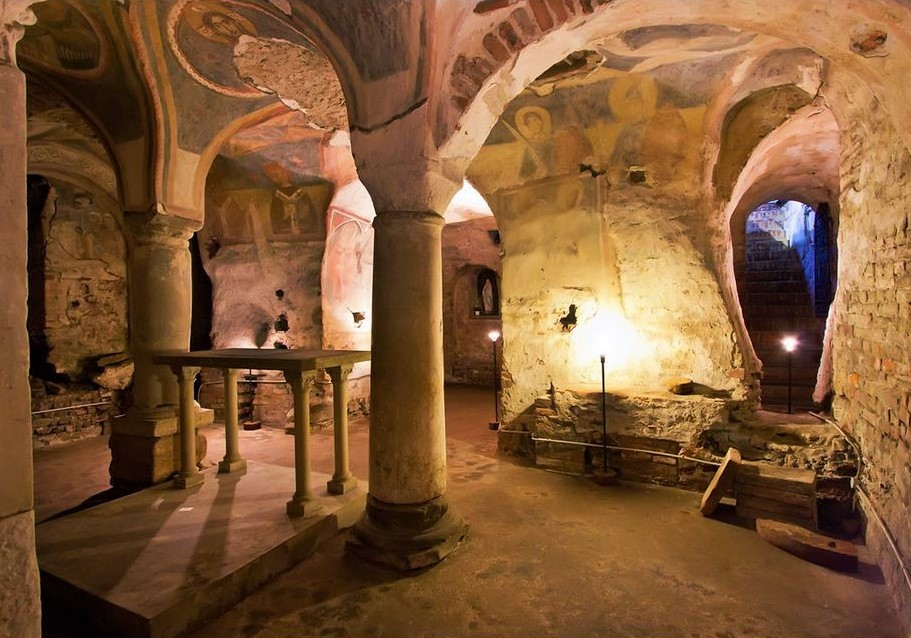
Interior of the crypt

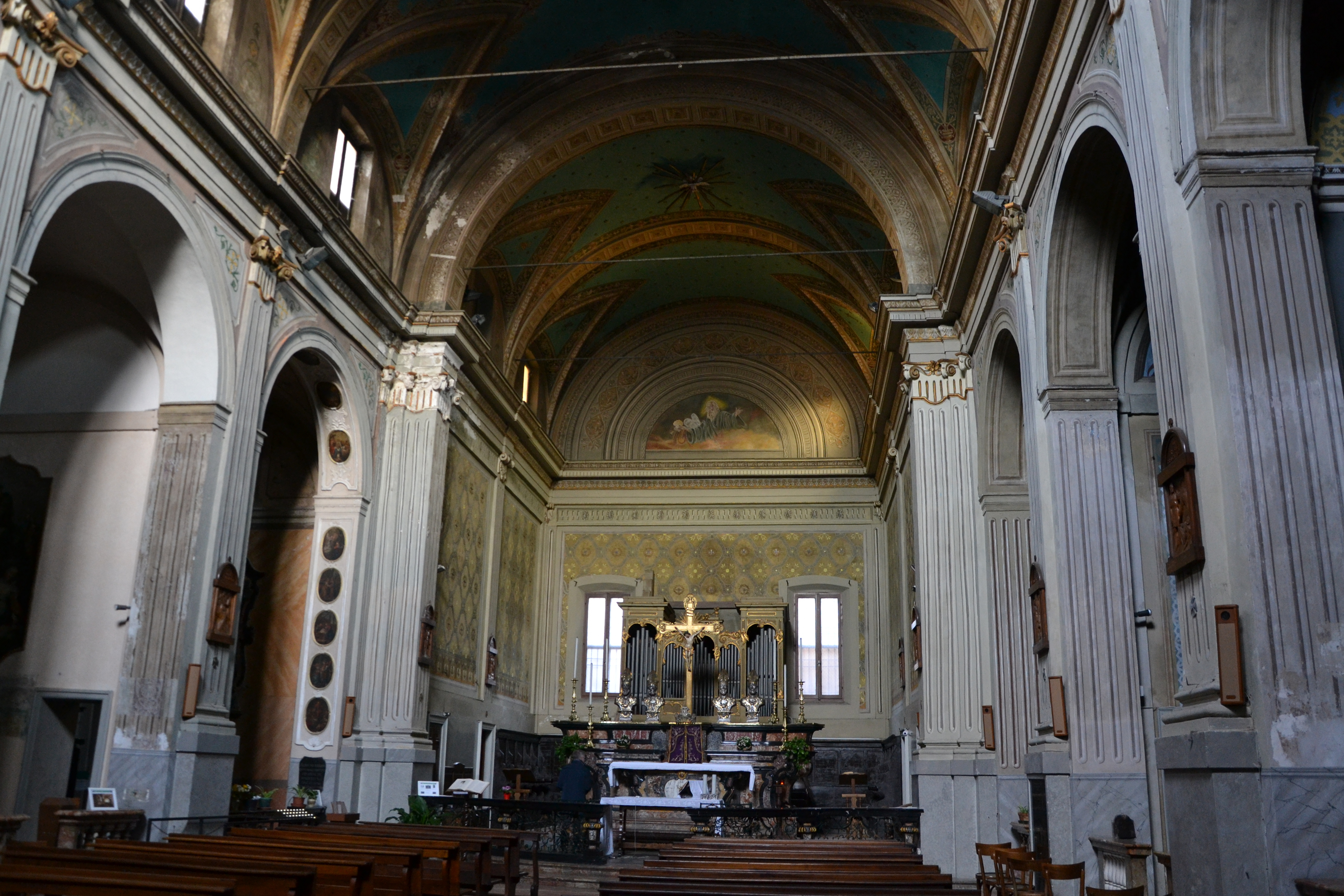
Interior

The building dates back to the 17th century and has a single hall, with side chapels and a square choir. The façade, on the other hand, dates back to the 15th century and in the central band it has a terracotta rose window placed between two smaller rose windows.

The mighty bell tower dates back to the mid-11th century. The construction uses various materials of Roman origin with decorative intent, especially in the part next to the belfry. Immediately on the right there is a part of the ancient baptistery annexed to the church, and in the first chapel, also on the right, there is an altarpiece, painted by the Milanese Giovan Battista Sassi, which depicts Saint Andrew Avellino dying in front of the altar. In the lunette of the presbytery there is a fresco with the Eternal Father by Federico Faruffini.

The construction of the crypt probably dates from the mid-10th to the beginning of the following century. It develops entirely under the current floor of the church and is accessed by a staircase from which you go down, on the north side of the church nave. Due to the interventions promoted in 1611, the crypt was closed and was used only as an ossuary.

Most of the supports are trapezoidal in shape with no capitals and shelves. On the other hand, the two columns that frame the altar bear bare capitals, some of the Roman age, others Lombard. The frescoes (dated to the 12th century) mostly portray local saints; there is a scene from the life of John the Baptist, very compromised. On the right pillar are depicted Saint Syrus and pope Gregory I, holding a volume in his hand. On the small pillar in front of Saint Syrus, there is the figure of Saint Juventius of Pavia, the second bishop of the city.

The discovery of the crypt, which had been buried for centuries and reduced to a burial ground, took place on April 18, 1914, thanks to the initiative of Monsignor Faustino Gianani who, following the indications of many historical sources, had a tunnel dug in the courtyard behind.

During the work following the discovery, the level of the original pavement was not recognized among the debris and was removed. Therefore, the current level is lower than the original one and corresponds to that of the Roman thermal environment, where the hypocaust of the Roman calidarium was located (later used in the Middle Ages as a quarry for bricks and building materials.

== Bibliography ==
- Musei Civici di Pavia. Pavia longobarda e capitale di regno. Secoli VI- X, a cura di S. Lomartire, D. Tolomelli, Skira, Milano, 2017.
- Luigi Carlo Schiavi, La cripta di San Giovanni Domnarum, in Pavia. Rilievi e nuovi studi sull'architettura, Tipografia Commerciale Pavese, Pavia, 2010.
