= Harodingians =

The Harodingian dynasty (Italian: Arodingi or Arodi) was a prominent Lombard noble family which provided Italy with two kings in the middle of the seventh century (636–653).

The Harodingians started out owning one small fara near Brescia. Then Rothari, son of Nanding, became Duke of Brescia and raised the fortunes of his family to great heights. In 636, he was elected to the Lombard throne. Through his marriage to Gundiperga, widow of Arioald and daughter of Authari and Theodelinda, he attained legitimacy and a connection to the ancient and illustrious Lething and Agilolfing families. Indeed, Gundiperga had been given the opportunity upon her husband's death to choose a new husband to reign over the Lombards. A Catholic herself, she chose the Arian but tolerant Rothari and thus changed the course of Lombard Italy and its Papal relations. Rothari's young son and successor, Rodoald, was the last Harodingian and last Arian to wear the Iron Crown. The Bavarian dynasty replaced them and another attempt to establish a long-lasting dynasty failed.

== Sources ==
- Jarnut, Jörg (1995) [1982]. Storia dei Longobardi (in Italian). Translated by Guglielmotti, Paola. Torino: Einaudi. ISBN 88-06-13658-5.
- Rovagnati, Sergio (2003). I Longobardi (in Italian). Milano: Xenia. ISBN 88-7273-484-3.
