= Book Covers of Theodelinda =

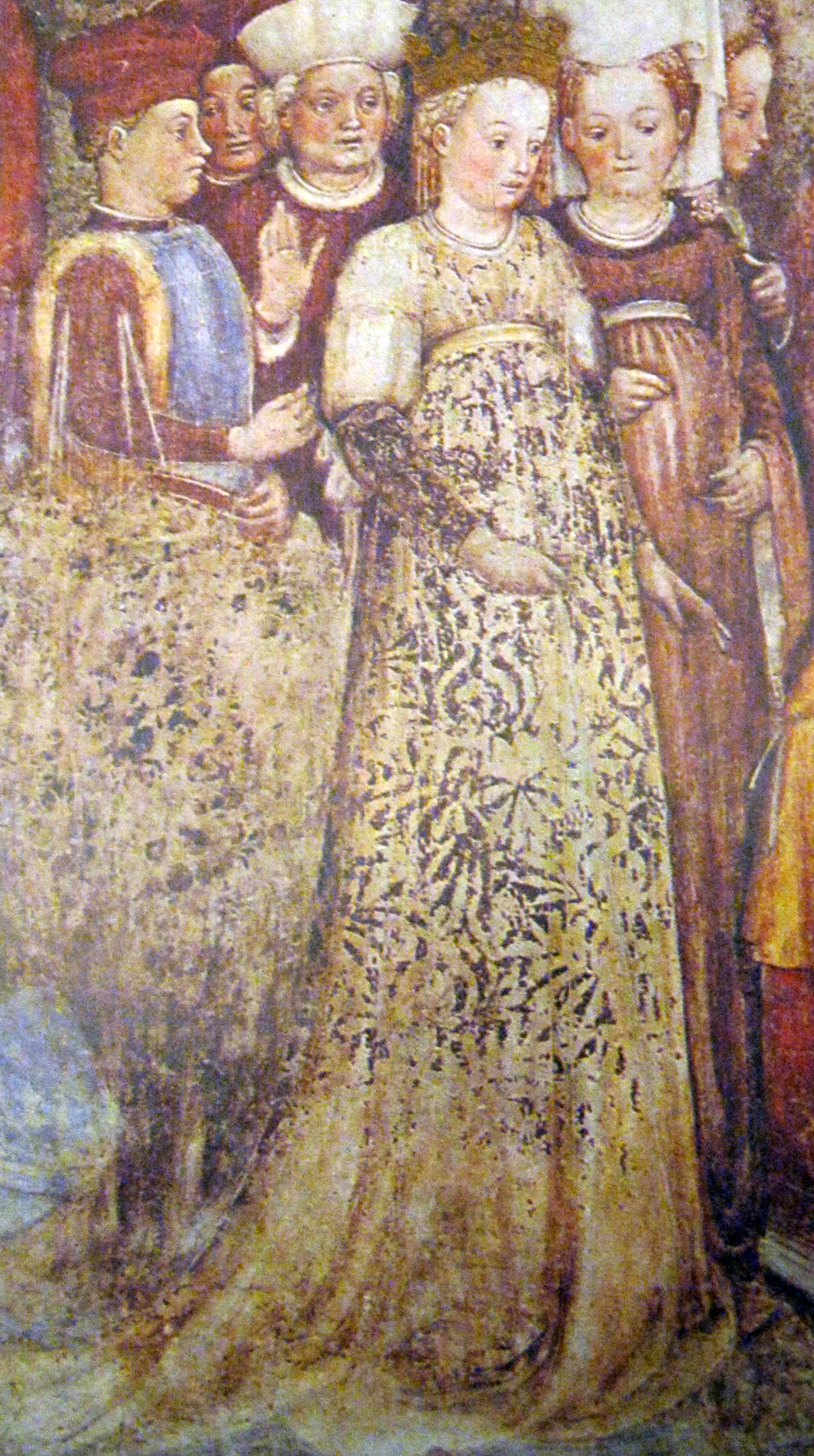
Theodelinda portrayed at the construction of the Cathedral of Monza

The book covers of Theodelinda are early medieval gold book covers dedicated by the queen Theodelinda to St. John the Baptist for a basilica which she founded between the sixth and seventh centuries at the Monza Cathedral in Monza, Italy. The book covers feature an inscription in which Theodelinda offers the book to the religious figure. Many scholars believe that the book covers, as well as the inscription were created in the early 7th century. The manuscript that the cover contained has been lost. Scholars regard the covers as an important example of Lombard metalwork, and they remain at Monza cathedral today. The book covers make part of a larger collection of objects gifted by the queen to the basilica she founded.

== Decoration ==
The main material making up the book covers of Theodelinda is gold, which is engraved and inset with green, red and blue jewels within the central design of a large cross. The central design of the large cross divides each book cover into four quadrants which are each perfectly symmetrical. The cross is partly composed of precious stones and party by a pattern formed by red glass set in gold. In two parallel lines, running quite across the field, are these words in Roman capitals: "De donis dei offerit Theodelinda regina gloriosissima Sancto Johanni Bapt in Basilica quam ipsa fundavit in Modicia prope pal suum." This is an important document in the sequence because, if it was made before Theodelinda died, it is the first record to link her to Monza, as founder of the church of Saint John the Baptist. The two covers feature the same design and are almost completely identical to each other. The covers are decorated with Roman-style cameos. Two of these cameos, which were replaced in 1773 feature the image of Christ and the Virgin Mary. On each cover, there are four cameos, perhaps representing the four evangelists.

== Original Contents ==
The decoration featured on the book covers of Theodelinda suggests that the covers most likely housed a Gospel Codex. The style of the covers of Theodelinda features similarities to other book covers from the period that contained the same kind of manuscript.

== Legacy ==
The book covers remain an example of early medieval religious book covers and are regarded by scholars as an important resource in examining early medieval ornamentations of Gospel Codices. The book covers also serve as an example of Lombard metalwork. Additionally, the inscription on the book covers make the work the first recorded instance of Theodelinda's involvement with the Monza Cathedral.
