= 636 =

Calendar year

636 in various calendars
Gregorian calendar	636; DCXXXVI
Ab urbe condita	1389
Armenian calendar	85; ԹՎ ՁԵ
Assyrian calendar	5386
Balinese saka calendar	557–558
Bengali calendar	42–43
Berber calendar	1586
Buddhist calendar	1180
Burmese calendar	−2
Byzantine calendar	6144–6145
Chinese calendar	乙未年 (Wood Goat); 3333 or 3126 — to — 丙申年 (Fire Monkey); 3334 or 3127
Coptic calendar	352–353
Discordian calendar	1802
Ethiopian calendar	628–629
Hebrew calendar	4396–4397
- Hindu calendars
Vikram Samvat	692–693
Shaka Samvat	557–558
Kali Yuga	3736–3737
Holocene calendar	10636
Iranian calendar	14–15
Islamic calendar	14–15
Japanese calendar	N/A
Javanese calendar	526–527
Julian calendar	636; DCXXXVI
Korean calendar	2969
Minguo calendar	1276 before ROC 民前1276年
Nanakshahi calendar	−832
Seleucid era	947/948 AG
Thai solar calendar	1178–1179
Tibetan calendar	阴木羊年 (female Wood-Goat); 762 or 381 or −391 — to — 阳火猴年 (male Fire-Monkey); 763 or 382 or −390

Year 636 (DCXXXVI) was a leap year starting on Monday of the Julian calendar. The denomination 636 for this year has been used since the early medieval period, when the Anno Domini calendar era became the prevalent method in Europe for naming years.

== Events ==
=== By place ===
==== Byzantine Empire ====
- Arab–Byzantine War: Emperor Heraclius assembles a large army consisting of contingents of Byzantines, Slavs, Franks, Georgians, Armenians, and Christian Arabs. He establishes a base at Yaqusah (near Gadara), close to the edge of the Golan Heights, protecting the vital main road from Egypt to Damascus. The base is protected by deep valleys and precipitous cliffs, well supplied with water and grazing.
- Summer – Heraclius summons a church assembly at Antioch, and scrutinises the situation. He accepts the argument that Byzantine disobedience to God is to blame for the Christian disaster in Syria. Heraclius leaves for Constantinople with the words, 'Peace be with you Syria — what a beautiful land you will be for your enemy'.

==== Central America ====
- April 28 – Yuknoom Chʼeen II becomes the ruler of the Mayan city state of Calakmul in southern Mexico and reigns for 50 years until his death in 686.

==== Europe ====
- Chintila is elected by a convention of bishops and nobles (in accordance with the 75th canon of the Fourth Council of Toledo) as ruler of the Visigoths, after the death of King Sisenand.
- Rothari (formerly duke of Brescia) marries widowed Queen Gundeberga, and succeeds Arioald as king of the Lombards. During his reign, he puts many insubordinate nobles to death.

==== Arabia ====
- August 15–20 – Battle of Yarmouk: In engagements along the Yarmouk River, Muslim forces (25,000 men) of the Rashidun Caliphate, led by Khalid ibn al-Walid, decisively defeat the armies of the Byzantine Empire, effectively completing the Muslim conquest of Syria. It will be regarded as one of the most decisive battles in military history, marking the first great wave of Muslim conquests, after the death of Muhammad.
- The city of Basra (modern Iraq) is founded on the Shatt al-Arab, at the head of the Persian Gulf. The port will become a major trading center for commodities from Arabia, India, and Persia.
- November 16–19 – Battle of al-Qādisiyyah: The Muslim Arab army defeats the Persian forces under Rostam Farrokhzād, at Al-Qādisiyyah (Southern Mesopotamia).

==== Asia ====
- The Xumi Pagoda of Zhengding (China) is built, during the reign of Emperor Taizong of Tang.

=== By topic ===
==== Literature ====
- The historical texts of the Book of Northern Qi, Book of Chen, and Book of Sui are compiled in China, during the Tang dynasty.

==== Religion ====
- Birinus, Bishop of Dorchester, converts Cwichelm (son of king Cynegils of Wessex) to Christianity. He dies soon afterward, and is supposedly buried at Scutchamer Knob, in East Hendred (South East England).
- June 30 – Fifth Council of Toledo: Chintila orders a meeting in the church of St. Leocadia; the bishops accept a decree that only Gothic nobility (with military functions) may be king of the Visigothic Kingdom.

== Births ==
- Æthelthryth, Anglo-Saxon princess (approximate date)
- Lambert of Maastricht, bishop (approximate date)

== Deaths ==
- April 4 – Isidore of Seville, archbishop and scholar
- Arioald, king of the Lombards
- Bahman Jadhuyih, Persian general
- Dervan, prince of the Sorbs
- Ecgric, king of East Anglia (approximate date)
- Cwichelm, king of Wessex (approximate date)
- George Pisida, Byzantine poet (approximate date)
- Jalinus, Armenian nobleman
- Rostam Farrokhzād, Persian general (or 637)
- Sa'd ibn Ubadah, companion of Muhammad (approximate date)
- Sisenand, king of the Visigoths
- Theodore Trithyrius, Byzantine general (sacellarius)
- Zhangsun, empress of the Tang dynasty (b. 601)
