= Book cover =

Protective covering used to bind together the pages of a book

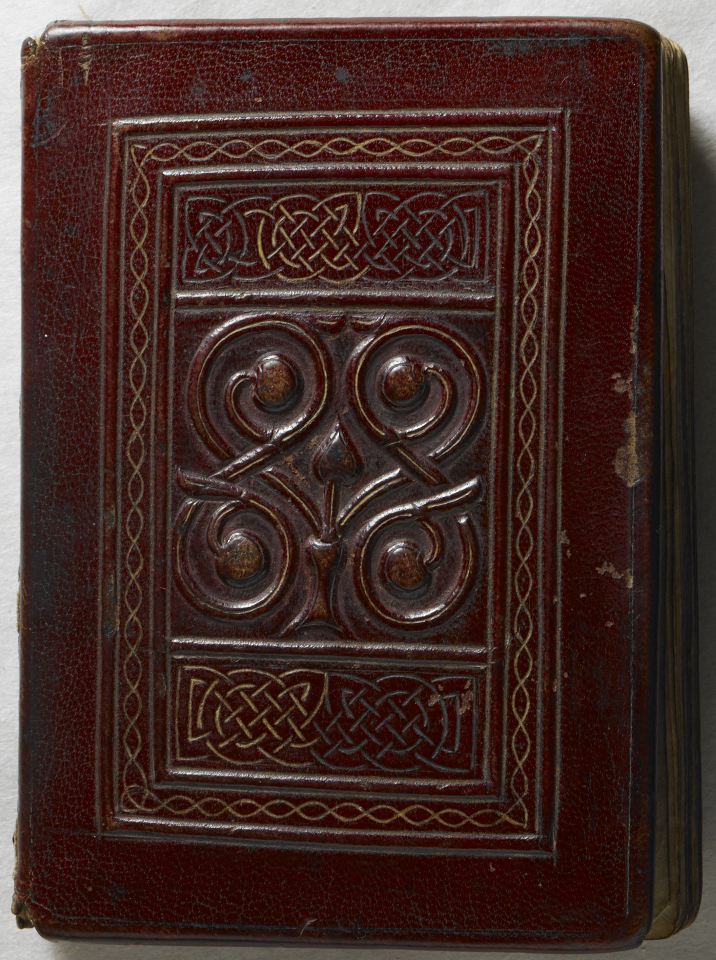
Front cover of the St Cuthbert Gospel, c. 700; the original tooled red goatskin binding is the earliest surviving Western binding.

A book cover is any protective covering used to bind together the pages of a book. Beyond the familiar distinction between hardcovers and paperbacks, there are further alternatives and additions, such as dust jackets, ring-binding, and older forms such as the nineteenth-century "paper-boards" and the traditional types of hand-binding. The term bookcover is also commonly used for a book cover image in library management software. This article is concerned with modern mechanically produced covers.

== History ==
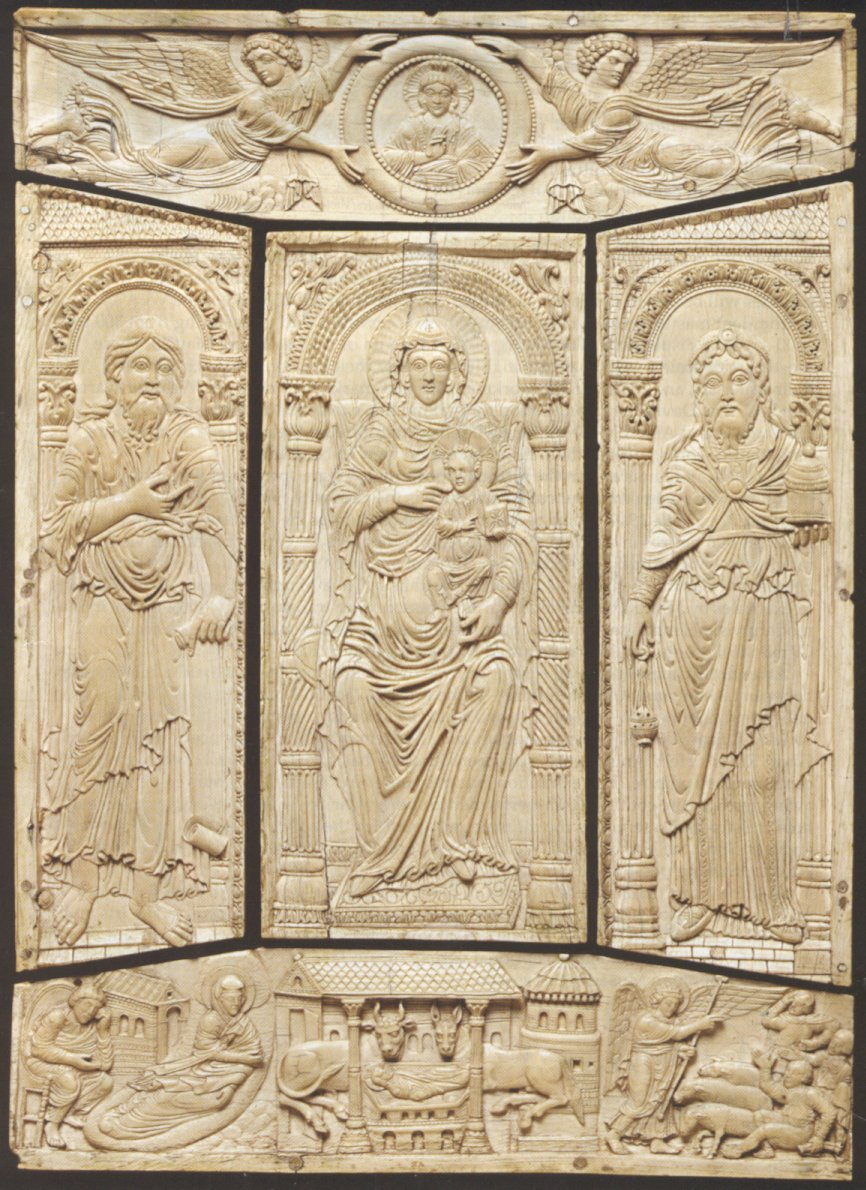
Ivory cover of the Codex Aureus of Lorsch, c. 810, Carolingian dynasty, Victoria and Albert Museum

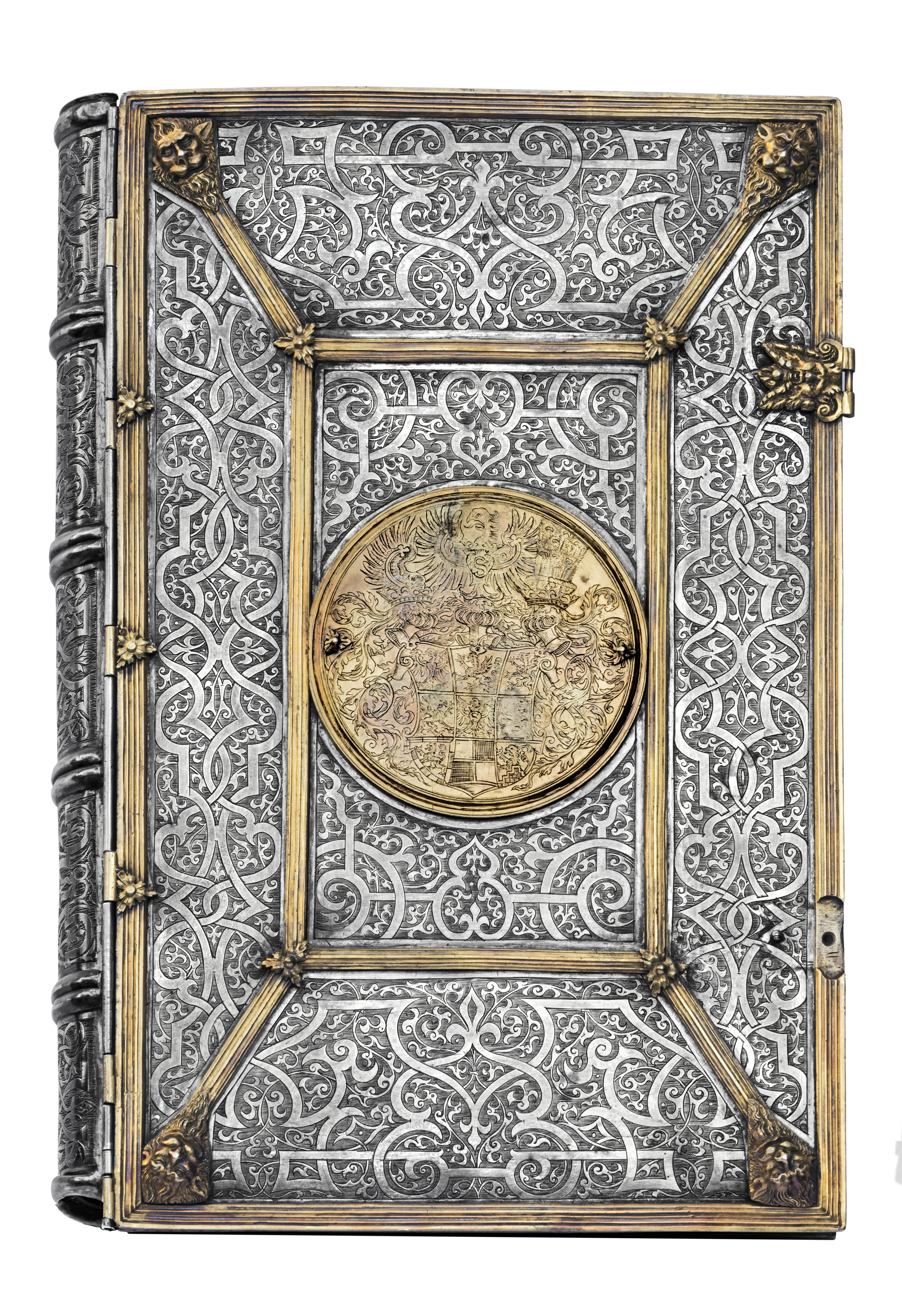
One of the goldsmith covers from the so-called silver library of Duke Albrecht Hohenzollern in Königsberg, now in Nicolaus Copernicus University Library, c. 1555

Before the early nineteenth century, books were hand-bound, in the case of luxury medieval manuscripts in treasure bindings using materials such as gold, silver and jewels. For hundreds of years, book bindings had functioned as a protective device for the expensively printed or hand-made pages, and as a decorative tribute to their cultural authority. In the 1820s great changes began to occur in how a book might be covered, with the gradual introduction of techniques for mechanical book-binding. Cloth, and then paper, became the staple materials used when books became so cheap—thanks to the introduction of steam-powered presses and mechanically produced paper—that to have them hand-bound became disproportionate to the cost of the book itself.

Not only were the new types of book-covers cheaper to produce, they were also printable, using multi-colour lithography, and later, halftone illustration processes. Techniques borrowed from the nineteenth-century poster-artists gradually infiltrated the book industry, as did the professional practice of graphic design. The book cover became more than just a protection for the pages, taking on the function of advertising, and communicating information about the text inside.

== Cover design ==
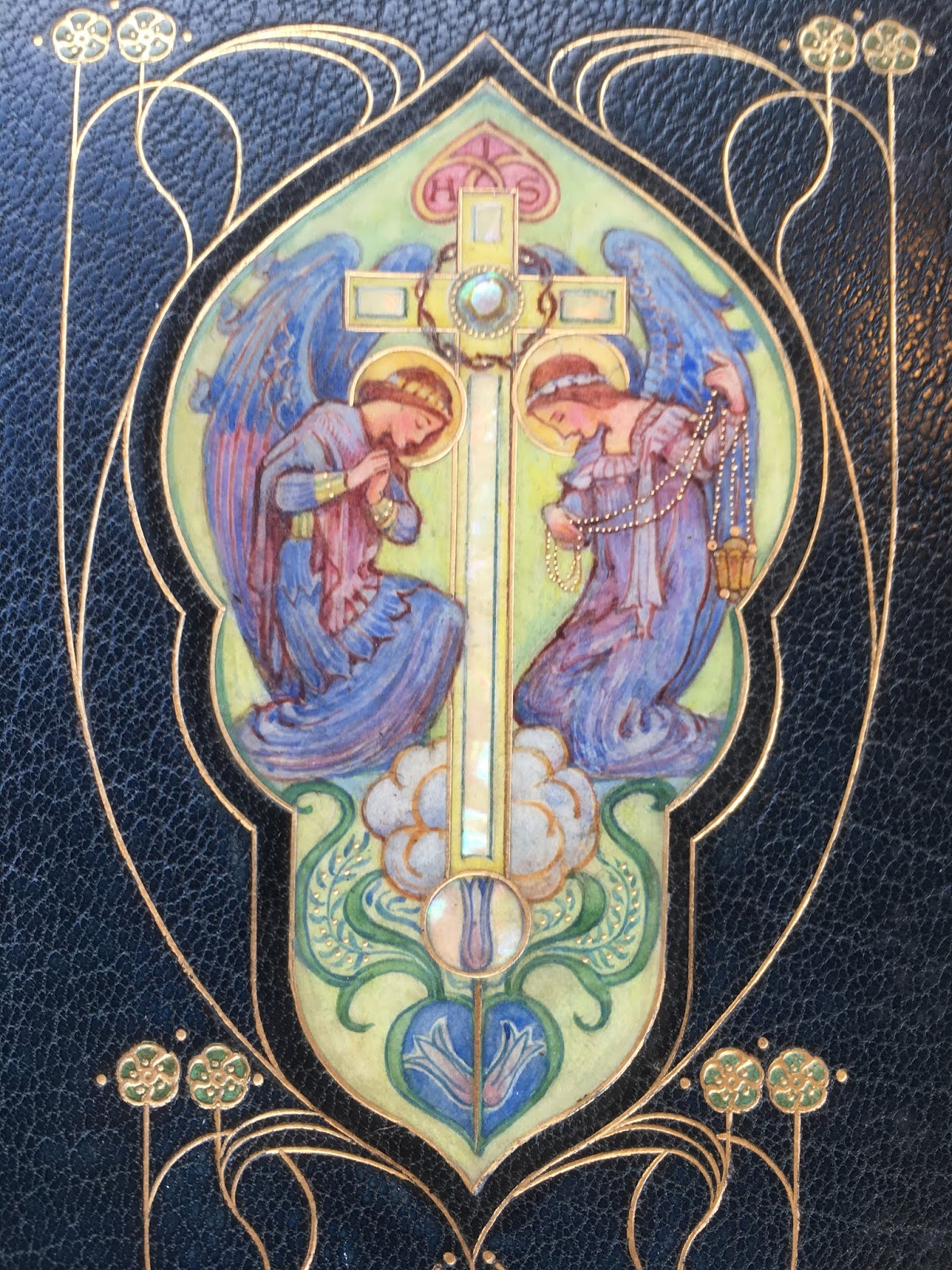
Detail of the cover of a pocket edition of the Book of Common Prayer, vellucent binding by Cedric Chivers with Art Nouveau gold tooling, hand-painted design inlaid with mother of pearl

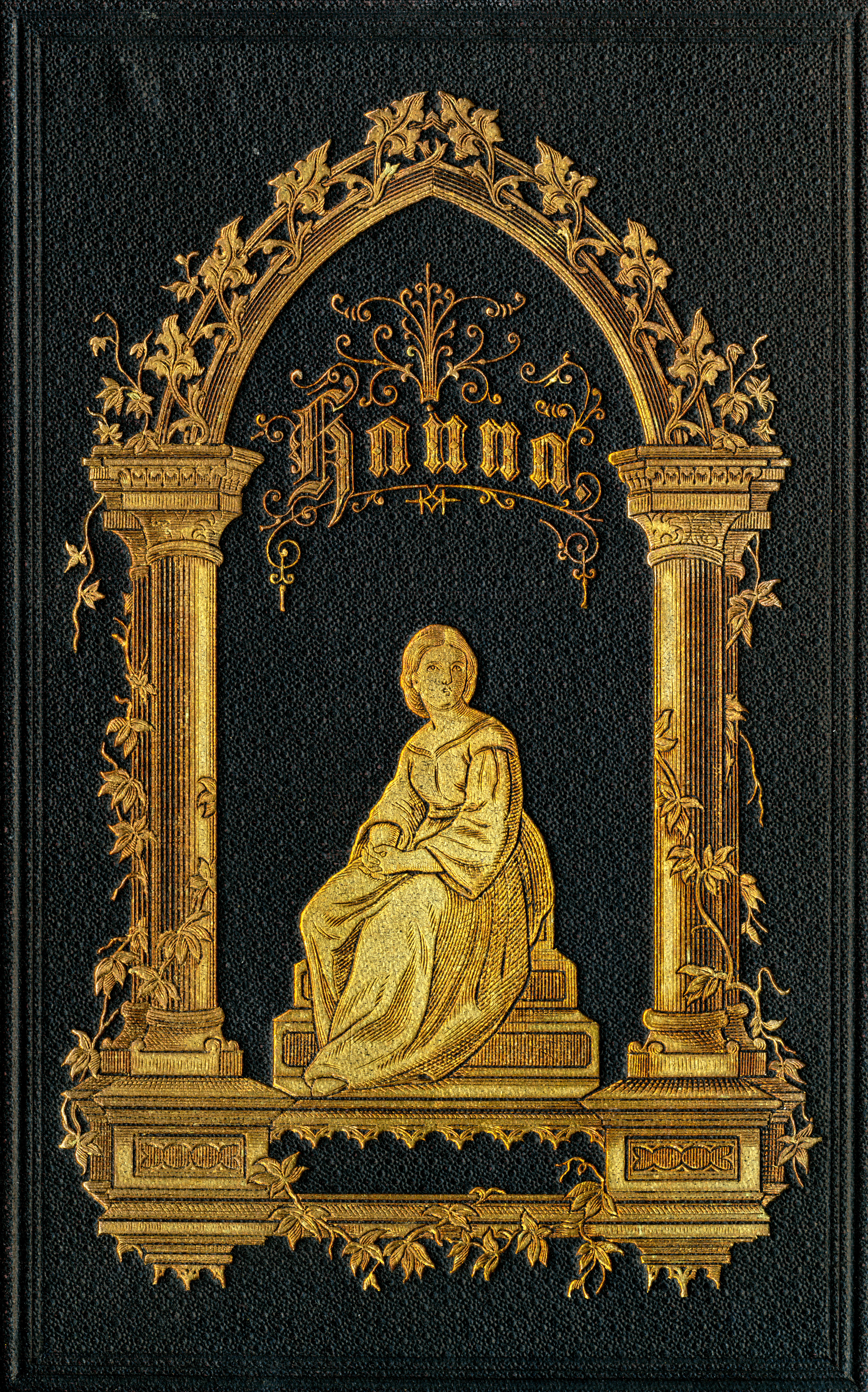
Early 20th century leather book cover, with gold leaf ornamentation

The Arts and Crafts and Art Nouveau movements at the turn of the twentieth century stimulated a modern renaissance in book cover design that soon began to infiltrate the growing mass book industry through the more progressive publishers in Europe, London and New York. Some of the first radically modern cover designs were produced in the Soviet Union during the 1920s by avant-gardists such as Alexander Rodchenko and El Lissitzky. Another highly influential early book cover designer was Aubrey Beardsley, thanks to his striking covers for the first four volumes of The Yellow Book (1894–1895).

In the post-war era, book covers have become vitally important as the book industry has become commercially competitive. Covers now give detailed hints about the style, genre and subject of the book, while many push design to its limit in the hope of attracting sales attention. Book covers need to effectively communicate their content to the intended market, which can encourage reliance on stereotypical representations, such as using the color pink for books by or about women, or showing a multiracial group on the cover of a book about racial diversity.

This can differ from country to country because of other tastes of the markets. So translated books can also have different book-accessories such as toys belonging to children's books, for example Harry Potter.

The era of internet sales has arguably not diminished the importance of the book cover, as it now continues its role in a two-dimensional digital form, helping to identify and promote books online.

Wraparound covers are also common.

== Contents ==
- Front cover contents may usually be:
  - For novels, the novel title in large letters, author name, tagline and symbol of publisher (in corner)
- Back cover (also called 'lower cover') contents may usually be:
  - For novels, a back cover text or teaser that gives a hint of the story in an attractive way.
  - A picture of the writer.
  - A summary

== Contamination of historic books ==
In the 19th century, Paris green and similar arsenic pigments were often used on front and back covers, top, fore and bottom edges, title pages, book decorations, and in printed or manual colorations of illustrations of books. Since February 2024, several German libraries started to block public access to their stock of 19th century books to check for the degree of poisoning.

== See also ==
- Bookbinding – the process of physically assembling a book
- Buckram – Stiff cloth of cotton, linen, or horsehair
- Book Covers of Theodelinda – a set of historically significant medieval book covers dedicated to Theodelinda.
- Don't judge a book by its cover, a phrase derived from the perceived difference between the portrayal of a book on its cover or jacket, and the book's contents
