= Engolpion =

Medallion worn by Eastern Orthodox and Eastern Catholic bishops

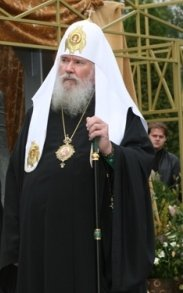
Patriarch Alexius II of Moscow wearing an engolpion (panagia)

An encolpion (also engolpion, enkolpion; Greek: ἐγκόλπιον, enkólpion, "on the chest"; plural: ἐγκόλπια, enkólpia) is a medallion with an icon in the center worn around the neck by Eastern Orthodox, Oriental Orthodox and Eastern Catholic bishops. The icon is normally surrounded by jewels (usually paste) and topped by an Eastern-style mitre. It often also has a small jewelled pendant hanging down at the bottom. The engolpion is suspended from the neck by a long gold chain, sometimes made up of intricate links. A portion of the chain will often be joined together with a small ring behind the neck so that it hangs down the back. Engolpia come in many different shapes, including oval, rhombus, square, or a double-headed eagle. In antiquarian contexts, an "encolpion cross" is a pectoral cross of the Byzantine period.

== History ==
According to St. Jerome, however (in Matt., c. xxiii), some of the faithful in his day attached a superstitious importance to these aids to piety; he censures certain classes of women who seem to have, in some degree, identified sanctity with an exaggerated veneration for sacred relics: "Hoc quod apud nos superstitiosae mulierculae in parvulis evangeliis et in crucis ligno et istiusmodi rebus, quae habent quidem zelum Dei, sed non secundum scientiam, factitant" (That which superstitious women amongst us, who have a certain zeal for God but not of right knowledge, do in regard to little copies of the Gospels, the wood of the cross, and things of that kind).

Engolpia were of various forms, oval, round, four-cornered and of various materials ranging from gold to glass. In 1571 two gold encolpia, square in form, were found in tombs of the ancient Vatican cemetery, engraved on one side with the monogram of Christ between the Alpha and Omega, and on the other with a dove. Another, now lost, was found in the tomb of Maria, wife of the Emperor Honorius, bearing the names of the imperial couple with the legend VIVATIS and the monogram.

The famous treasure of Monza contains the theca persica, enclosing a text from the Gospel of St. John, sent by Pope St. Gregory the Great (590-604) to Queen Theodolinda for her son Adaloald. Another of the gifts of this pope to the Lombard queen was a cruciform encolpion containing a portion of the True Cross.

Probably the most interesting reliquary of this form is a gold pectoral cross discovered at Rome in 1863, in the basilica of S. Lorenzo (fuori le mura), on the breast of a corpse. On one side it bears the inscription: "EMMANOTHA NOBISCUM DEUS" ("Emmanuel, God with us"), and on the other: "CRUX EST VITA MIHI, MORS INIMICE TIBI" ("To me the Cross is life; to thee, O enemy, it is death").

To the category of engolpia belong also the ampullae, or vials or vessels of lead, clay or other materials in which were preserved such esteemed relics as oil from the lamps that burned before the Holy Sepulchre, and the golden keys with filings from St. Peter's chains, one of which was sent by St. Gregory the Great to the Frankish King Childebert.

Encolpion, a different anglicization of the same word, covers the early medieval tradition in both Eastern and Western Christianity.

== Modern use ==
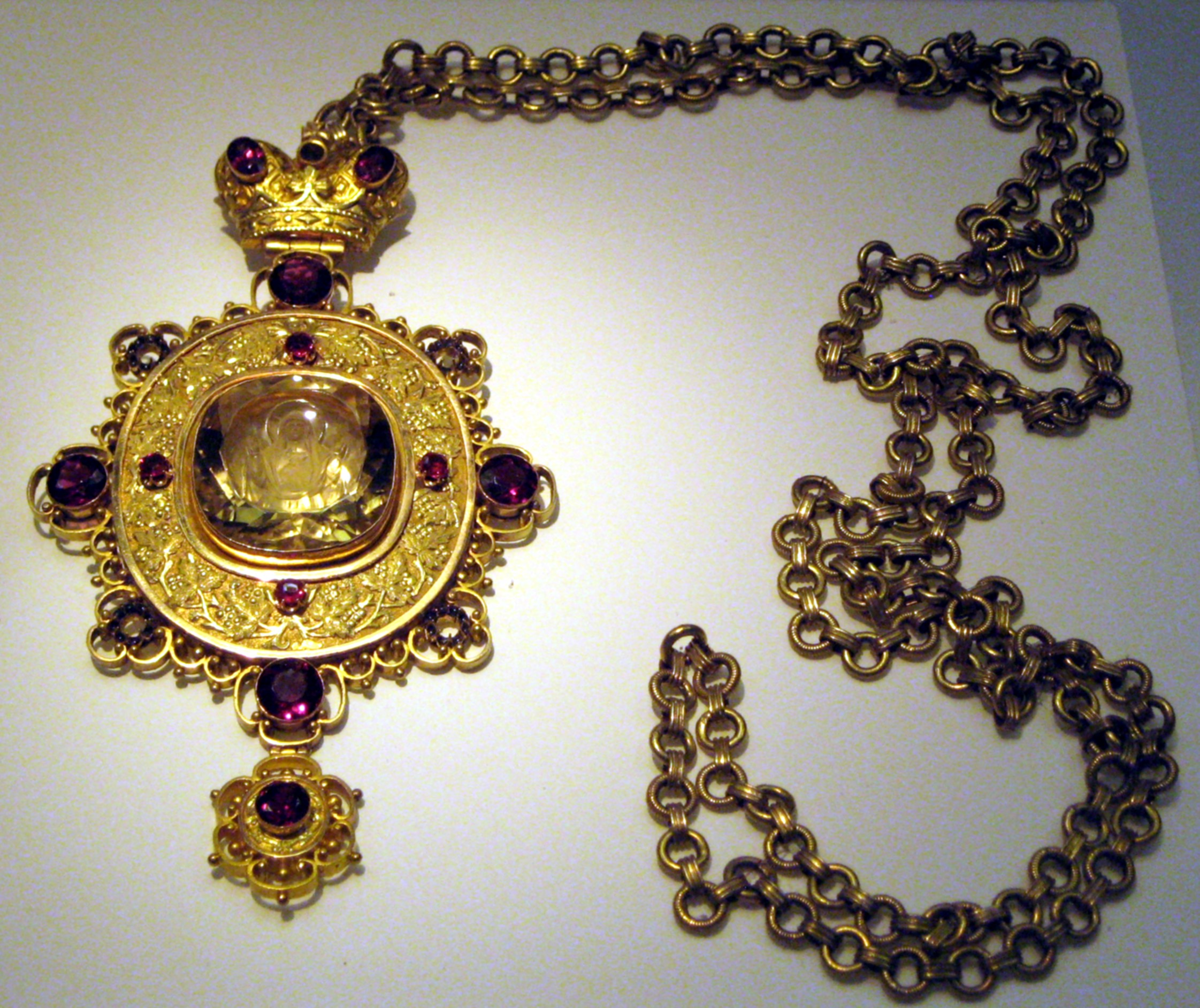
Engolpion (Panagia) depicting the Znamenny Icon of the Theotokos.

All bishops wear a particular kind of engolpion called a Panagia (Greek: Παναγία), which depicts the Theotokos (Virgin Mary). All primates and some bishops below primatial rank have the dignity of wearing a second engolpion, which usually depicts Christ. Occasionally, an archimandrite may be awarded an engolpion which bears not an icon of Christ or the Theotokos, but of the Cross. The enkolpion may be worn at all times as part of the bishop's street dress or choir dress. When the bishop vests for Divine Services, he will wear also a pectoral cross. When a bishop is vested before the Divine Liturgy, if he has the dignity of wearing an enkolpion in addition to the Panagia, the Protodeacon chants the following prayer as the subdeacons place it on the bishop: "Thy heart is inditing of a good matter; thou shalt speak of the deeds unto the King, always, now and ever, and unto the ages of age. Amen."

Some enkolpia are hollow, so they may be used as a reliquary. The enkolpia may have originated from the eucharistic lockets once worn by monks in order to be able to communicate themselves when they travelled. Since bishops are monks and often travelled they would have naturally have had such lockets and since they were bishops their eucharistic lockets would have been made and ornamented with much more precious materials than those of ordinary monks.
