= Duke of Turin =

Duke of Turin was the title of a line of dukes among the Lombards when they ruled Italy in the Early Middle Ages.

Several holders went on to become king, including Agilulf, Raginpert, Arioald and Aripert II.
