= 652 =

Calendar year

652 in various calendars
- Gregorian calendar: 652; DCLII
- Ab urbe condita: 1405
- Armenian calendar: 101; ԹՎ ՃԱ
- Assyrian calendar: 5402
- Balinese saka calendar: 573–574
- Bengali calendar: 58–59
- Berber calendar: 1602
- Buddhist calendar: 1196
- Burmese calendar: 14
- Byzantine calendar: 6160–6161
- Chinese calendar: 辛亥年 (Metal Pig); 3349 or 3142 — to — 壬子年 (Water Rat); 3350 or 3143
- Coptic calendar: 368–369
- Discordian calendar: 1818
- Ethiopian calendar: 644–645
- Hebrew calendar: 4412–4413
- Hindu calendars
- Vikram Samvat: 708–709
- Shaka Samvat: 573–574
- Kali Yuga: 3752–3753
- Holocene calendar: 10652
- Iranian calendar: 30–31
- Islamic calendar: 31–32
- Japanese calendar: Hakuchi 3 (白雉３年)
- Javanese calendar: 543–544
- Julian calendar: 652; DCLII
- Korean calendar: 2985
- Minguo calendar: 1260 before ROC 民前1260年
- Nanakshahi calendar: −816
- Seleucid era: 963/964 AG
- Thai solar calendar: 1194–1195
- Tibetan calendar: ལྕགས་མོ་ཕག་ལོ་ (female Iron-Boar); 778 or 397 or −375 — to — ཆུ་ཕོ་བྱི་བ་ལོ་ (male Water-Rat); 779 or 398 or −374

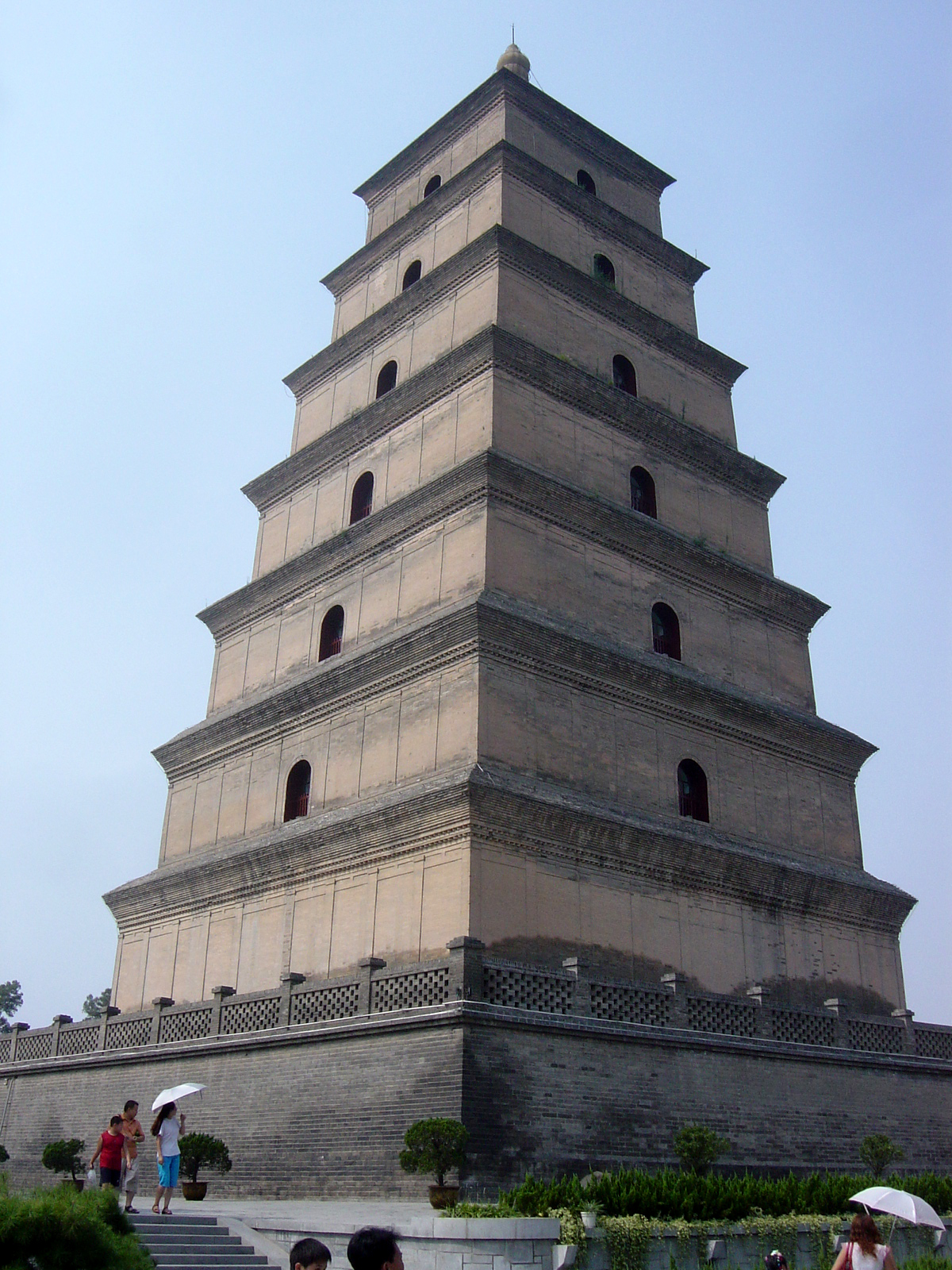
The Giant Wild Goose Pagoda in Xi'an (China)

Year 652 (DCLII) was a leap year starting on Sunday of the Julian calendar. The denomination 652 for this year has been used since the early medieval period, when the Anno Domini calendar era became the prevalent method in Europe for naming years.

== Events ==
=== By place ===
==== Europe ====
- King Rothari dies after a 16-year reign, and is succeeded by his son Rodoald as king of the Lombards.

==== Britain ====
- King Penda of Mercia invades Bernicia, and besieges King Oswiu at Bamburgh, in North East England.

==== Arab Empire ====
- Arab–Byzantine War: An Arab fleet under Abdullah ibn Sa'ad defeats the Byzantine fleet (500 ships) off the coast of Alexandria.
- Siege of Dongola: A Rashidun army (5,000 men) under Abdullah ibn Sa'ad besieges Dongola in the Kingdom of Makuria (modern Sudan).
- Uthman ibn Affan establishes a treaty (the Baqt) between the Christian Nubians and the Muslims in Egypt, that lasts for six centuries, including the tribute of 400 slaves annually.
- Abd al-Rahman ibn Awf, companion (sahabah) of Muhammad, frees 30,000 slaves at his death (approximate date).

==== Asia ====
- The registers of population are prepared in Japan. Fifty houses are made a township, and for each township there is appointed an elder. The houses are all associated in groups of five for mutual protection, with one elder to supervise them one with another. This system prevails until the era of World War II.
- The Giant Wild Goose Pagoda is constructed in Chang'an (modern Xi'an), during the Tang dynasty (China). It is completed in the same year, during the reign of Emperor Gao Zong.

== Births ==
- Chlothar III, king of Neustria and Burgundy (d. 673)
- Constantine IV, Byzantine emperor (d. 685)
- Li Hong, prince of the Tang dynasty (d. 675)

== Deaths ==
- Abbas ibn Abd al-Muttalib, uncle of Muhammad (approximate date)
- Abdel Rahman ibn Awf, companion of Muhammad (approximate date)
- Abu Sufyan ibn Harb, Arabic leader (b. 560)
- Emmeram, bishop of Regensburg (approximate date)
- Itta of Metz, widow of Pippin of Landen (b. 592)
- Li Tai, prince of the Tang dynasty (b. 618)
- Olympius, exarch of Ravenna
- Rothari, king of the Lombards
