= Rothari =

King of the Lombards from 636 to 652

- King of the Lombards
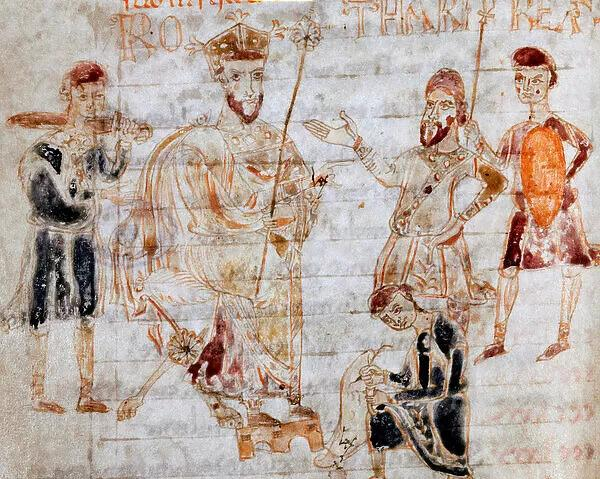
- Miniature of King Rothari from the 11th century "Codex Legum Longobardorum"
- Reign: 636–652
- Predecessor: Arioald
- Successor: Rodoald
- Born: c. 606
- Died: 652 (aged 45–46)
- Spouse: Gundeberga
- Issue: Rodoald
- Dynasty: Harodingian
- Father: Nanding
- Religion: Arian

Rothari (or Rothair) (c. 606–652), of the house of Arodus, was king of the Lombards from 636 to 652; previously he had been duke of Brescia. He succeeded Arioald, who was an Arian like himself, and was one of the most energetic of Lombard kings. Fredegar relates (Chronicle, 71) that at the beginning of his reign he put to death many insubordinate nobles, and that in his efforts for peace he maintained very strict discipline.

== Life ==
Rothari was the son of Nanding, and Duke of Brescia. Upon the death of Arioald in 636, he was elected King of the Lombards. He married Arioald's widow, Gundeberga, daughter of King Agilulf and Queen Theodelinda. The Catholic Gundeberga agreed to marry the Arian Rothari because he was tolerant of Catholics. He managed to reinforce the central authority of the king in the face of resistance on the part of the dukes.

== Career ==
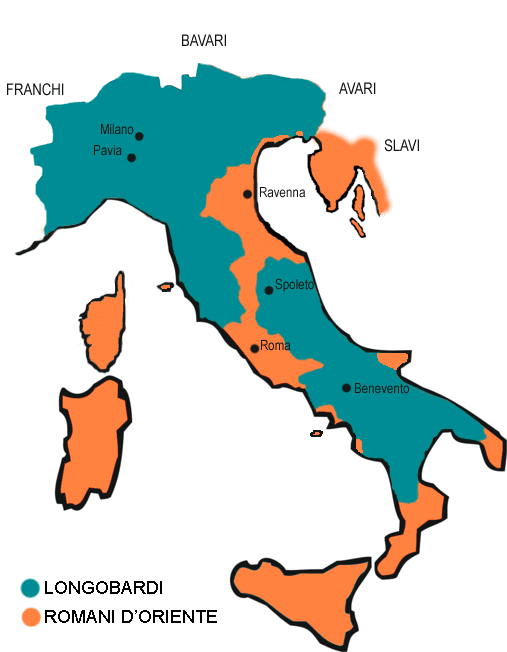
Italy at the time of Rothari.

Rothari conquered Genoa in 641 and all remaining Eastern Roman territories in the lower valley of the Po, including Oderzo (Opitergium) in 641. Before commencing a campaign the rest of Eastern Roman Liguria in 643, he issued the Edictum Rothari a compilation of Lombard law based on ancient customs. According to Paul the Deacon, "Rothari then captured all the cities of the Romans which were situated upon the shore of the sea from the city of Luna in Tuscany up to the boundaries of the Franks." (IV.xlv)

With these quick conquests, he left the Eastern Roman Empire with only the Ravennan marshes in northern Italy. The exarch of Ravenna, Plato, tried to regain some territory, but his invading army was defeated by Rothari on the banks of the Scultenna (the Panaro) near Modena, with the loss of 8,000 men, in 645. However, he recaptured Oderzo at same year. Oderzo finally was razed again by Grimoald in 667.

== Legacy ==
According to Paul the Deacon, Rothari proved militarily successful - he was the conqueror of Liguria - but his greatest legacy was legislative. In 642/643 he promulgated the Edictum Rothari, the first written codification of Lombard customary law, composed in Latin and affirmed in a gairethinx. This substantial code, which survives independently, provided a lasting legal framework for the kingdom and marked a turning point in the institutional consolidation of Lombard rule.

Although not of the dominant Bavarian dynasty that controlled much of the succession between 616 and 712, Rothari reinforced his position by marrying into it, following the same pattern later taken by Grimoald of Benevento. Like Grimoald, he fought the Byzantines and issued laws, establishing himself as both a warrior and a lawgiver. His reign represents the acceptance of two cornerstones of the Lombard political tradition: the Romanized court of Agilulf and the codification of Lombard law.

He was succeeded by his son Rodoald. A baptistery in Monte Sant'Angelo is traditionally known as the "Tomb of Rothari", although he was probably buried in the church of San Giovanni Domnarum in Pavia, founded by his wife Gundeberga.

== Notes ==
Regnal titles
| Preceded by Alchis | Duke of Brescia ? – 636 | Succeeded by Gaidoald |
| Preceded by Arioald | King of the Lombards; 636–652 | Succeeded by Rodoald |
