= 601 =

Calendar year

601 in various calendars
- Gregorian calendar: 601; DCI
- Ab urbe condita: 1354
- Armenian calendar: 50; ԹՎ Ծ
- Assyrian calendar: 5351
- Balinese saka calendar: 522–523
- Bengali calendar: 7–8
- Berber calendar: 1551
- Buddhist calendar: 1145
- Burmese calendar: −37
- Byzantine calendar: 6109–6110
- Chinese calendar: 庚申年 (Metal Monkey); 3298 or 3091 — to — 辛酉年 (Metal Rooster); 3299 or 3092
- Coptic calendar: 317–318
- Discordian calendar: 1767
- Ethiopian calendar: 593–594
- Hebrew calendar: 4361–4362
- Hindu calendars
- Vikram Samvat: 657–658
- Shaka Samvat: 522–523
- Kali Yuga: 3701–3702
- Holocene calendar: 10601
- Iranian calendar: 21 BP – 20 BP
- Islamic calendar: 22 BH – 21 BH
- Japanese calendar: N/A
- Javanese calendar: 490–491
- Julian calendar: 601; DCI
- Korean calendar: 2934
- Minguo calendar: 1311 before ROC 民前1311年
- Nanakshahi calendar: −867
- Seleucid era: 912/913 AG
- Thai solar calendar: 1143–1144
- Tibetan calendar: ལྕགས་ཕོ་སྤྲེ་ལོ་ (male Iron-Monkey); 727 or 346 or −426 — to — ལྕགས་མོ་བྱ་ལོ་ (female Iron-Bird); 728 or 347 or −425

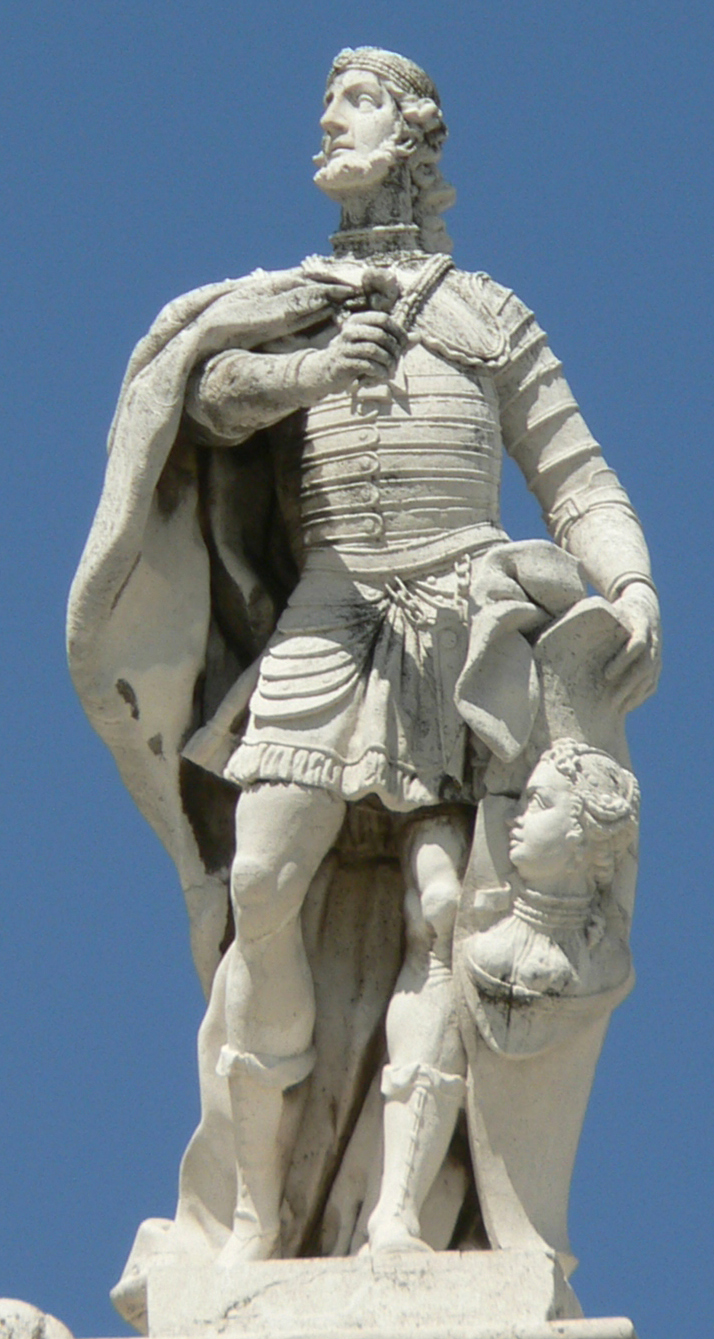
King Liuva II (583–603)

Year 601 (DCI) was a common year starting on Sunday of the Julian calendar. The denomination 601 for this year has been used since the early medieval period, when the Anno Domini calendar era became the prevalent method in Europe for naming years.

== Events ==
=== By place ===
==== Byzantine Empire ====
- Balkan Campaign: A Byzantine army under command of Peter, brother of Emperor Maurice, crosses the Danube and advances to the Tisza River, where it defeats the Avars.

==== Europe ====
- The Franks, Merovingians and Carolingians successively control most of Europe, while strong feudal lords rise in power to gain the allegiance of the people.
- The Lombards under King Agilulf expand into Northern Italy, establishing a settlement with the Franks and maintaining intermittent relationships with Rome.
- Liuva II, age 18, succeeds his father Reccared I as king of the Visigoths. Reccared dies a natural death at the capital in Toledo after a 15-year reign.

=== By topic ===
==== Arts and sciences ====
- The Qieyun, a Chinese character rhyme dictionary, is published.

==== Agriculture ====
- Food production increases in northern and Western Europe as a result of agricultural technology introduced by the Slavs, who employ a lightweight plow with a knife blade (coulter), that cuts deep into the soil at grassroots level, together with a shaped board, or "moldboard", that moves the cut soil to one side.

==== Religion ====
- The future Archbishops of Canterbury (Mellitus, Justus, and Honorius), and the future Archbishop of York Paulinus, are sent to England by Pope Gregory I to aid Augustine in his missionary work. Gregory writes the decretal Libellus responsionum to Augustine.

== Births ==
- September 13 – Ali, central figure in Shia Islam (d. 661)
- Hongren, Chán (Buddhist) patriarch of the Tang dynasty (d. 674)
- Ma Zhou, chancellor of the Tang dynasty (d. 648)
- Sigebert II, king of Austrasia and Burgundy (d. 613)
- Zhangsun, empress of the Tang dynasty (d. 636)

== Deaths ==
- March 13 or 600 – Leander, bishop of Seville
- Agilulf, bishop of Metz
- Reccared I, king of the Visigoths (b. 559)
- Bertha of Kent, Frankish-born Anglo-Saxon queen consort, canonized (b. c.565) (approximate date)
- Sophia, Byzantine Empress consort (approximate date)
