= Adaloald =

King of the Lombards from 616 to 626

- King of the Lombards
- Reign: 616 – 626
- Predecessor: Agilulf
- Successor: Arioald
- Born: c. 602
- Died: 628 (aged 25–26); Ravenna
- Father: Agilulf
- Mother: Theodelinda

Adaloald (c. 602–628) was the Lombard king of Italy from 616 to 626.

He was son and heir of King Agilulf and his Catholic queen Theodelinda. He was baptised shortly after his birth in 602; the abbot Secundus of Non (later historian) was his godfather. He was an associate king, raised on the shield by the warriors at his father's request, when still young. Upon becoming sole king as a teenager, he reigned with his mother serving as regent. In his History of the Lombards, Paul the Deacon reports that many churches were renovated and many donations to holy sites were made under their joint reign.

Adaloald went insane and lost the support of the nobles. He was deposed by them in 626 and replaced by Arioald, a Lombard noble from Turin and husband of the king's sister Gundeberga, who was hostile to the Catholic Church. Adaloald died mysteriously in Ravenna shortly after, in 628.

== Notes ==
Regnal titles
Preceded by Agilulf	King of the Lombards; 616 – 626	Succeeded by Arioald
