= 674 =

Calendar year

674 in various calendars
- Gregorian calendar: 674; DCLXXIV
- Ab urbe condita: 1427
- Armenian calendar: 123; ԹՎ ՃԻԳ
- Assyrian calendar: 5424
- Balinese saka calendar: 595–596
- Bengali calendar: 80–81
- Berber calendar: 1624
- Buddhist calendar: 1218
- Burmese calendar: 36
- Byzantine calendar: 6182–6183
- Chinese calendar: 癸酉年 (Water Rooster); 3371 or 3164 — to — 甲戌年 (Wood Dog); 3372 or 3165
- Coptic calendar: 390–391
- Discordian calendar: 1840
- Ethiopian calendar: 666–667
- Hebrew calendar: 4434–4435
- Hindu calendars
- Vikram Samvat: 730–731
- Shaka Samvat: 595–596
- Kali Yuga: 3774–3775
- Holocene calendar: 10674
- Iranian calendar: 52–53
- Islamic calendar: 54–55
- Japanese calendar: Hakuchi 25 (白雉２５年)
- Javanese calendar: 565–566
- Julian calendar: 674; DCLXXIV
- Korean calendar: 3007
- Minguo calendar: 1238 before ROC 民前1238年
- Nanakshahi calendar: −794
- Seleucid era: 985/986 AG
- Thai solar calendar: 1216–1217
- Tibetan calendar: ཆུ་མོ་བྱ་ལོ་ (female Water-Bird); 800 or 419 or −353 — to — ཤིང་ཕོ་ཁྱི་ལོ་ (male Wood-Dog); 801 or 420 or −352

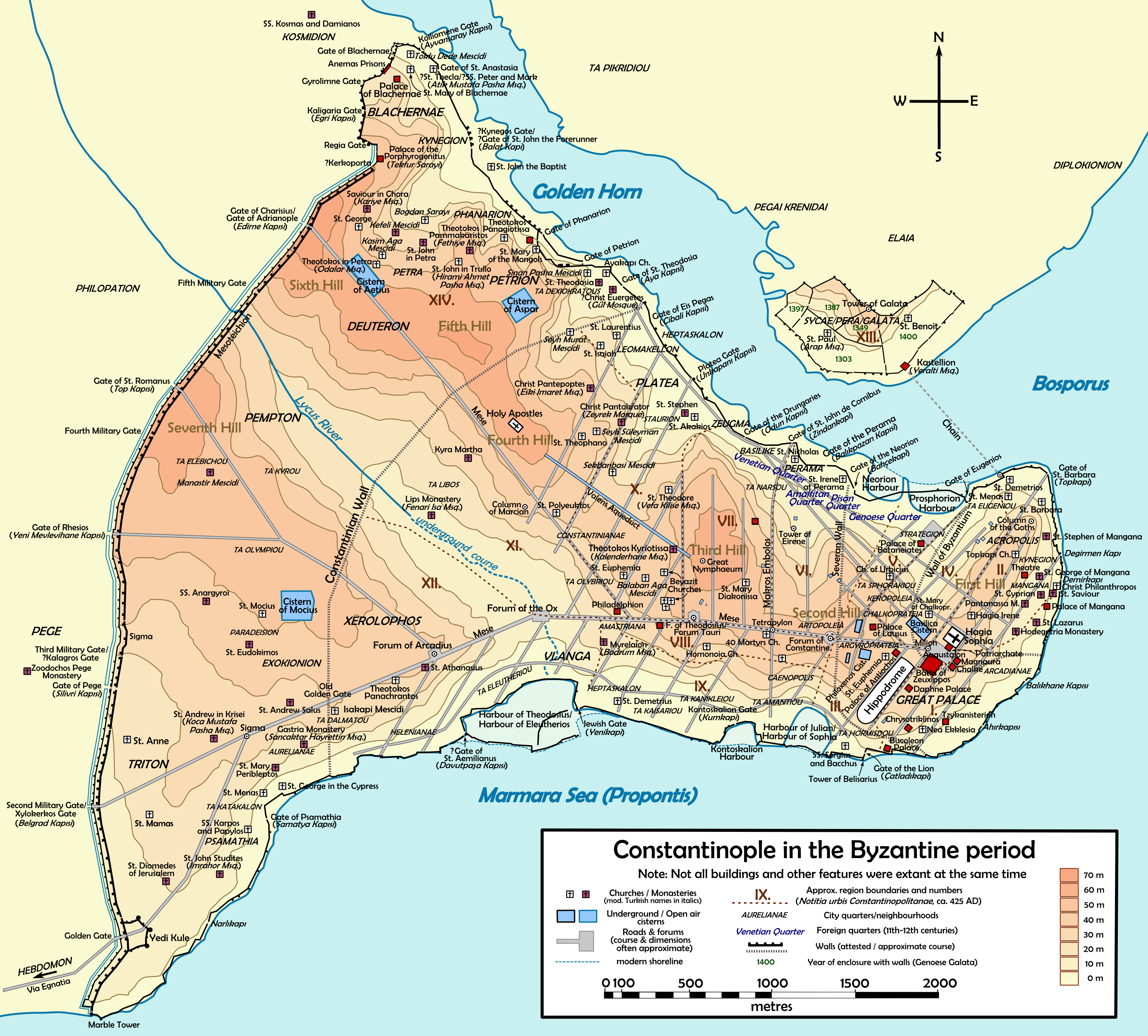
Constantinople during the Byzantine period

Year 674 (DCLXXIV) was a common year starting on Sunday of the Julian calendar. The denomination 674 for this year has been used since the early medieval period, when the Anno Domini calendar era became the prevalent method in Europe for naming years.

== Events ==
=== By place ===
==== Byzantine Empire ====
- Siege of Constantinople: The Arab fleet enters the Sea of Marmara and appears before the southern walls of Constantinople, in an attempt to blockade the Byzantine capital.
- April – A Muslim expeditionary force disembarks on the Thracian shore (near Hebdomon), and lays siege to the massive Theodosian Walls, on the landward side to the west.
- Summer – Abu Ayyub al-Ansari, companion and standard-bearer of Muhammad, is killed during the first attempt of the siege of the city (approximate date).
- Winter – Arab forces under Yazid (son of caliph Muawiyah I) retire to Cyzicus (Turkey). For the next 4 years the Arab fleet installs a loose blockade around Constantinople.

==== Europe ====
- The Muslim-Arabs raid Crete, killing and enslaving many soldiers (approximate date).

==== Britain ====
- King Ecgfrith of Northumbria defeats a coalition led by the Mercians. He annexes the region of Lindsey (Lincolnshire).
- King Æscwine succeeds his father Cenfus as ruler of Wessex (approximate date).

==== Asia ====
- King Vikramaditya I of Chalukya defeats the Pallavan army in battle, and destroys its capital Kanchi (modern India).
- In Korea, Anapji is constructed by order of King Munmu of Silla.
- In Japan, Princess Ōku proceeds to the Ise Jingu.

=== By topic ===
==== Religion ====
- Æthelthryth, former queen of Northumbria, gives large areas of land to bishop Wilfrid to found Hexham Abbey.
- The Monkwearmouth monastery is founded by Benedict Biscop in Northumbria.
- The first glass windows are placed in English churches (approximate date).

== Births ==
- Guthlac of Crowland, Anglo-Saxon hermit ((approximate date; d. 714)

== Deaths ==
- Abu Ayyub al-Ansari, friend (sahabah) of Muhammad (approximate date)
- Disibod, Irish monk and hermit (b. 619)
- Hassan ibn Thabit, Arab poet and companion of Muhammad
- Hongren, Chán (Buddhist) patriarch of the Tang dynasty (b. 601)
- Seaxburh, queen of Wessex (approximate date)
