= Arioald =

King of the Lombards from 626 to 636

- King of the Lombards
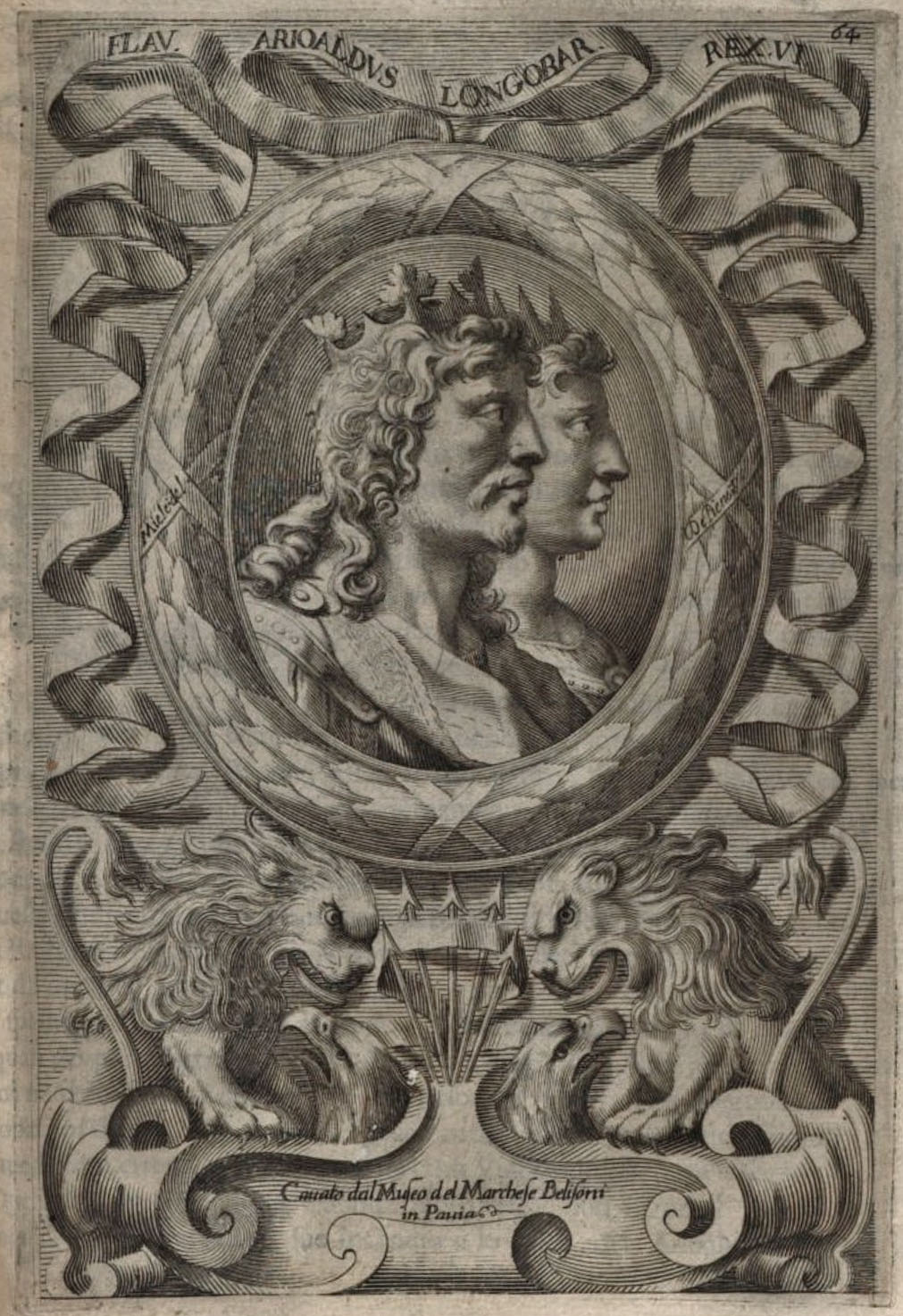
- Engraving of Arioald. From Emanuele Tesauro. Del regno d'Italia sotto i barbari. Turin: Bartolomeo Zavatta, 1664.
- Reign: 626 – 636
- Predecessor: Adaloald
- Successor: Rothari
- Spouse: Gundeberga
- Religion: Arian

Arioald was the Lombard king of Italy from 626 to 636. Duke of Turin, he married the princess Gundeberga, daughter of King Agilulf and his queen Theodelinda. He was, unlike his father-in-law, an Arian who did not accept Catholicism.

Arioald deposed Agilulf's heir Adaloald with the support of the nobility, for Adaloald had gone mad. Upon becoming king, he had his wife locked up in a monastery, accusing her of plotting against him with Tasson, duke of Friuli. He also reestablished Arianism in the Lombard kingdom. His only recorded wars were against the Avars, whom he succeeded in repelling during an attempted invasion of northeast Italy.

== Notes ==
Regnal titles
Preceded by Agilulf	Duke of Turin; 590 – 626	Unknown
Preceded by Adaloald	King of the Lombards; 626 – 636	Succeeded by Rothari
