= Gundeberga =

Queen consort of the Lombards
- Tenure: 626–652
- Born: c. 591; Province of Monza and Brianza
- Died: after 653
- Burial: San Giovanni Domnarum; Pavia or Burgheimer_Kirche; Lahr/Schwarzwald
- Spouse: Arioald; Rothari
- House: Bavarian dynasty (cognatic)
- Father: Agilulf
- Mother: Theodelinda

Gundeberga or Gundeperga (c. 591 – after 653) was queen of the Lombards in 626–652 by marriage to the kings Arioald (king of the Lombards; 626–636) and his successor Rothari (king of the Lombards; 636–652). She acted as Regent during the minority of her stepson Rodoald after the death of her second husband in 652.

== Life ==
She was the daughter of Theodelinda and her second husband, the Lombard king Agilulf. As her mother was the daughter of duke Garibald I of Bavaria, Gundeberga is considered part of the Bavarian Dynasty of Lombard royalty.

She married Arioald, (king of the Lombards; 626–636), becoming queen of Lombardy. After the death of her husband in 636, the people needed a King, the Queen Gundeberga wrote to (future King) Rothari, the Duke of Brescia. In her letter, she asked him to leave his wife and bring him and his child to the palace to be wed to her in return was his role as King. He agreed and her marriage was set with Rothari, (king of the Lombards; 636–652). She became the stepmother of Rodoald. Upon the death of her second husband Rothari in 652, he was succeeded by his son Rodoald. Since Rodoald was too young to rule in accordance with Lombard custom, Gundeberga formally acted as his regent.

Rodoald died in 653. It is known that Gundeberga survived his death, but her later life is not documented in historical sources.

We do not know the exact year of her death, and it was surmised for a long time that she was buried in Pavia in the church of San Giovanni Domnarum, which she founded. However, even though the crypt does exist, there is no certainty that Gundeberga was interred in her crypt. This is because the crypt was constructed before 653, and changed circumstances, such as fleeing into exile, may mean that Gundeberga lived on and died elsewhere.

There is some archaeological and genetic evidence that Gundeberga left Italy in 653 and sought refuge at the royal Allemanic court at Burgheim (near Lahr/Germany). A flight to exile at the Allemanic court would have made logical sense, because Gundeberga's first cousin Appa was married to an Allemanic nobleman. At Burgheim church, the oldest church on the right bank of the river Rhine, in the late 20th century an archeological dig under archeologist Knausenberger discovered the undisturbed crypt of the presumed founder of the church. It happened to be a likely Lombard princess from Northern Italy who must have lived in the 7th century, as could be deduced from the artefacts found. There is additional YDNA evidence that a subclade which was local to Northern Italy in the 7th century (sample CL63 of the Collegno dig) suddenly appeared in Burgheim afterwards, as can be deduced from living descendants with proven patrilineal roots in medieval Burgheim. Hence it may be the case that the Italian princess buried in grave no. 10 at Burgheim church may be Gundeberga, who may have died in exile at the royal Allemanic court.
