= Agilulf =

King of the Lombards from 590 to 616

- King of the Lombards
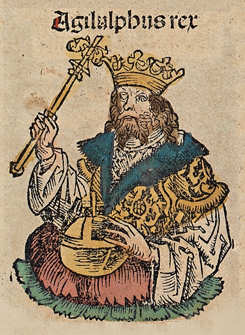
- Woodcut vignette of Agilulf in the 1493 Nuremberg Chronicle
- Reign: 590–616
- Predecessor: Authari
- Successor: Adaloald
- Born: c. 555
- Died: April 616; Milan, Neustria; Lombard Kingdom
- Spouse: Theodelinda
- Issue: Adaloald; Gundeberga
- Religion: Arianism

Agilulf (c. 555 – April 616), also known as the Thuringian, was a Duke of Turin and king of the Lombards from 591 until his death. A relative of his predecessor Authari, Agilulf was of Thuringian origin and belonged to the Anawas clan.

He is sometimes referred to as dux Turingorum de Taurinis, suggesting that he was a prominent leader among the Thuringians who had joined the Lombards following the fall of their kingdom to the Franks in 531.

== Biography ==
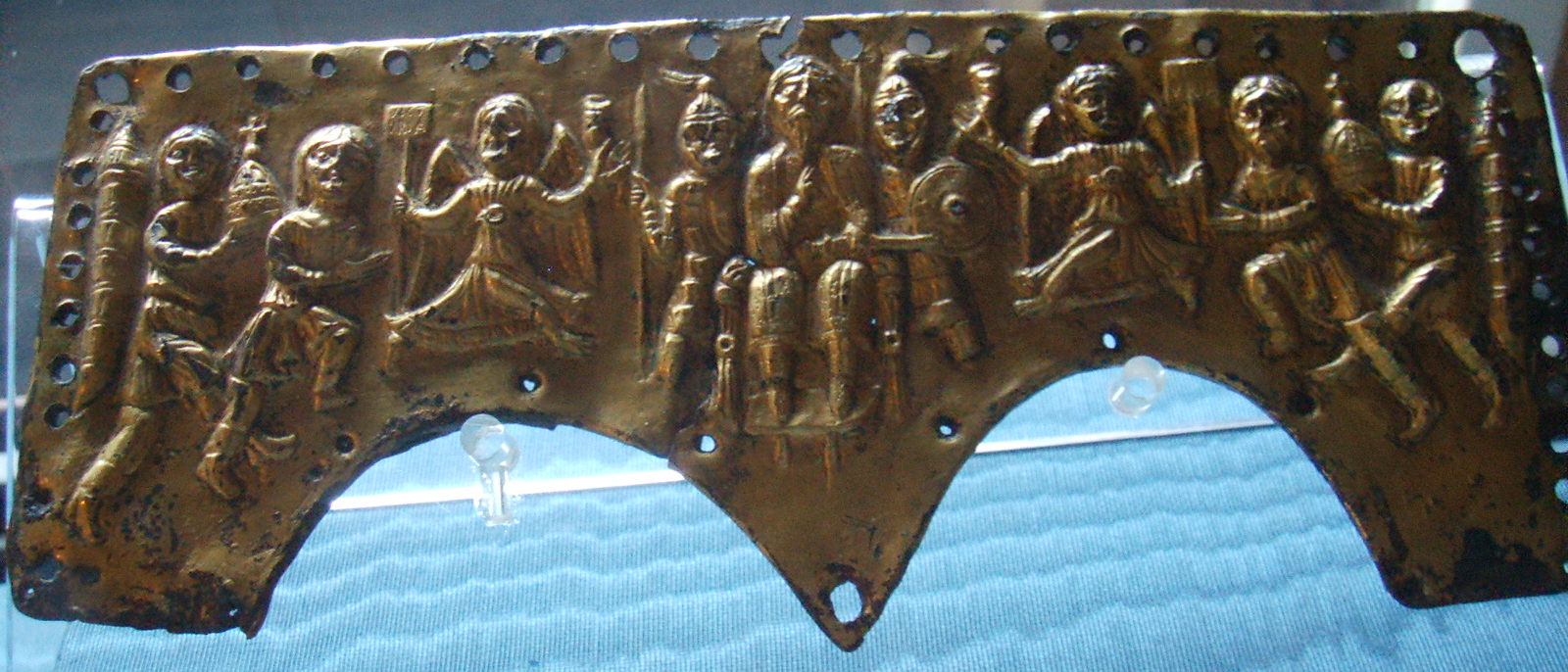
Gilt bronze forehead plate of a lamellar helmet depicting the coronation of King Agilulf, found at Valdinievole, now in the Bargello National Museum, Florence.

Agilulf was chosen as king on the advice of Theodelinda, the Christian queen and widow of Authari, whom he subsequently married. Although he assumed the royal title in November 590, his formal investiture—being raised on a shield by Lombard warriors—took place in Milan in May 591.

He was baptized to appease his wife, and the nation followed suit—though initially adopting the Arian rather than the Roman Catholic faith. In 603, under Theodelinda's influence, Agilulf converted to Catholicism and had his son, Adaloald, baptized in the same rite. Together, Agilulf and Theodelinda built and endowed the Cathedral of Monza, where the Iron Crown of Lombardy is still preserved. Agilulf's own crown, now lost, was also kept there; it was dedicated to St John and inscribed with rex totius Italiae ("king of all Italy"), reflecting how Agilulf evidently regarded his authority.

Agilulf's long reign was marked by the cessation of hostilities with Francia following the death of its chief peacemaker, Guntram, King of Burgundy, in 592. Without Guntram's moderating influence, the Franks fell into civil war, preventing any coordinated assault on Lombard territory throughout Agilulf's rule.

In 598, he concluded a truce with the Papacy, temporarily ending three decades of Lombard incursions into the Ducatus Romanus. With peace in the west, Agilulf concentrated his military efforts on the Byzantine threat. That same year, he consolidated Lombard control in central Italy by capturing Sutri, Perugia, and other Umbrian cities from the Exarchate of Ravenna, while also maintaining friendly relations with Bavaria.

He campaigned successfully against the Avars and Slavs, and negotiated a truce with the Byzantine emperor Maurice in 598, with the assistance of Pope Gregory the Great. However, the peace was short-lived. In 599, the Exarch Callinicus violated the truce by abducting Agilulf's daughter while she was travelling.

War resumed, and in 602, the Byzantine emperor Phocas lost Padua, which had already been isolated from Ravenna during the reign of Authari. The fall of Padua cut off Mantua, which also fell to Agilulf before the year ended.

In 605, Agilulf was formally recognized by the Byzantine emperor Phocas, who agreed to pay tribute and ceded Orvieto, along with other towns, to the Lombards. The outbreak of the Persian Wars diverted Byzantine attention to the East, providing Agilulf with a decade of relative peace in Italy.

In 607, Witteric, king of the Visigoths, forged a quadruple alliance against Theuderic II of Burgundy, enlisting Theudebert II of Austrasia, Clotaire II of Neustria, and Agilulf. Theuderic's wife, Ermenberga—Witteric's daughter—had been murdered by Theuderic's grandmother, Brunhilda of Austrasia, and sister, prompting the diplomatic backlash. The alliance, however, appears to have achieved little, and only vague accounts of combat survive, possibly centered around Narbonne.

Agilulf faced internal unrest during his later reign and dealt with further Avar incursions. In 610, the Avars invaded Friuli, killing its duke, Gisulf. Despite these episodes, the final years of Agilulf's reign were largely peaceful. He died in 616, having ruled for over a quarter of a century.

He was succeeded by his son, Adaloald, whom he had fathered with Theodelinda. Though still an adolescent at the time of succession, Adaloald had previously been associated with the throne. Agilulf also had a daughter, Gundeberga, who later married Arioald, a future king of the Lombards.

== Notes ==
Regnal titles
Preceded by Aimone	Duke of Turin; 589–590	Succeeded by Arioald
Preceded by Authari	King of the Lombards; 590–616	Succeeded by Adaloald
