= Theodelinda =

6th/7th-century queen of the Lombards

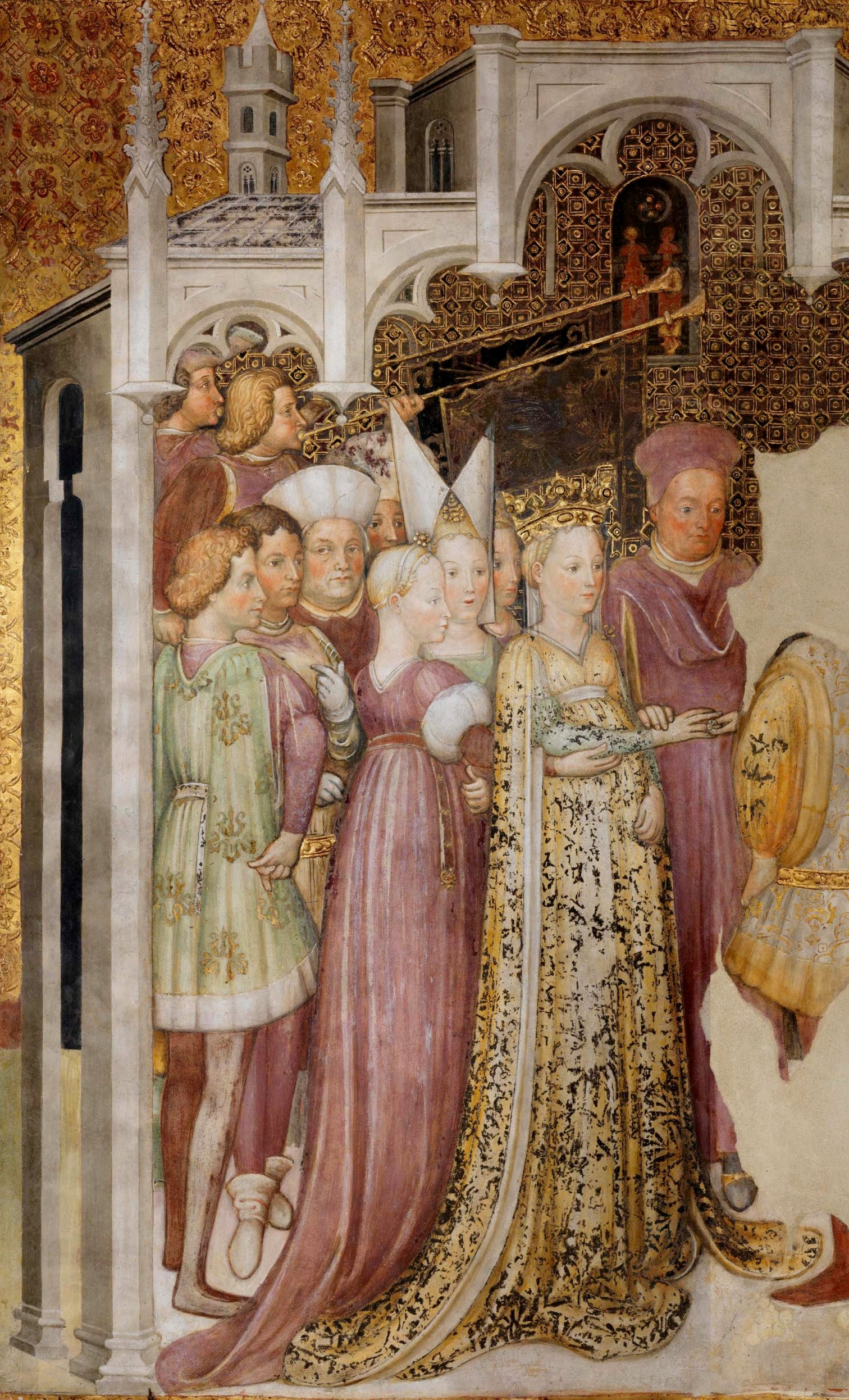
- Theodelinda in a fresco by Zavattari

Queen consort of the Lombards
- Tenure: 15 May 589 – 5 September 590; May 591 – 616
- Born: c. 570; Regensburg
- Died: 22 January 627/628; Monza
- Burial: Duomo of Monza
- Spouse: Authari; Agilulf
- Issue: Adaloald; Gundeberga
- House: Agilolfings
- Father: Garibald I of Bavaria
- Mother: Waldrada

Theodelinda, also spelt Theudelinde (c. 570 – 628 AD), was a queen of the Lombards through marriage to two successive Lombard kings, Authari and Agilulf. She later served as regent of the Kingdom of the Lombards during the minority of her son, Adaloald, and as co-regent after he came of age, from 616 to 626. For well over thirty years, she wielded considerable influence throughout the Lombard realm, which encompassed much of Italy between the Apennines and the Alps.

== Life ==
She was the daughter of duke Garibald I of Bavaria and Waldrada. Born a Bavarian princess to King Garibald, Theodelinda's heritage included being descended on her mother's side from the previous Lombard king, Waco, whose family had ruled seven generations prior according to tradition.

=== First marriage ===
Theodelinda was married first in 588 to Authari, king of the Lombards, son of King Cleph. There are indications that Pope Gregory I may have had an interest in encouraging this marriage, as it would tie a Bavarian Catholic with the Arian Lombards, (Note: Maintaining a relationship with Theodelinda was in the interest of the Catholic papacy as it provided Gregory with a toehold on the Lombard court.) something he did previously, when he promoted the marriage between the Frankish princess Bertha —great-granddaughter of Clovis I—and the Kentish Æthelberht of Kent. Theodelinda's time with Authari was brief, for he died in 590.

=== Second marriage ===
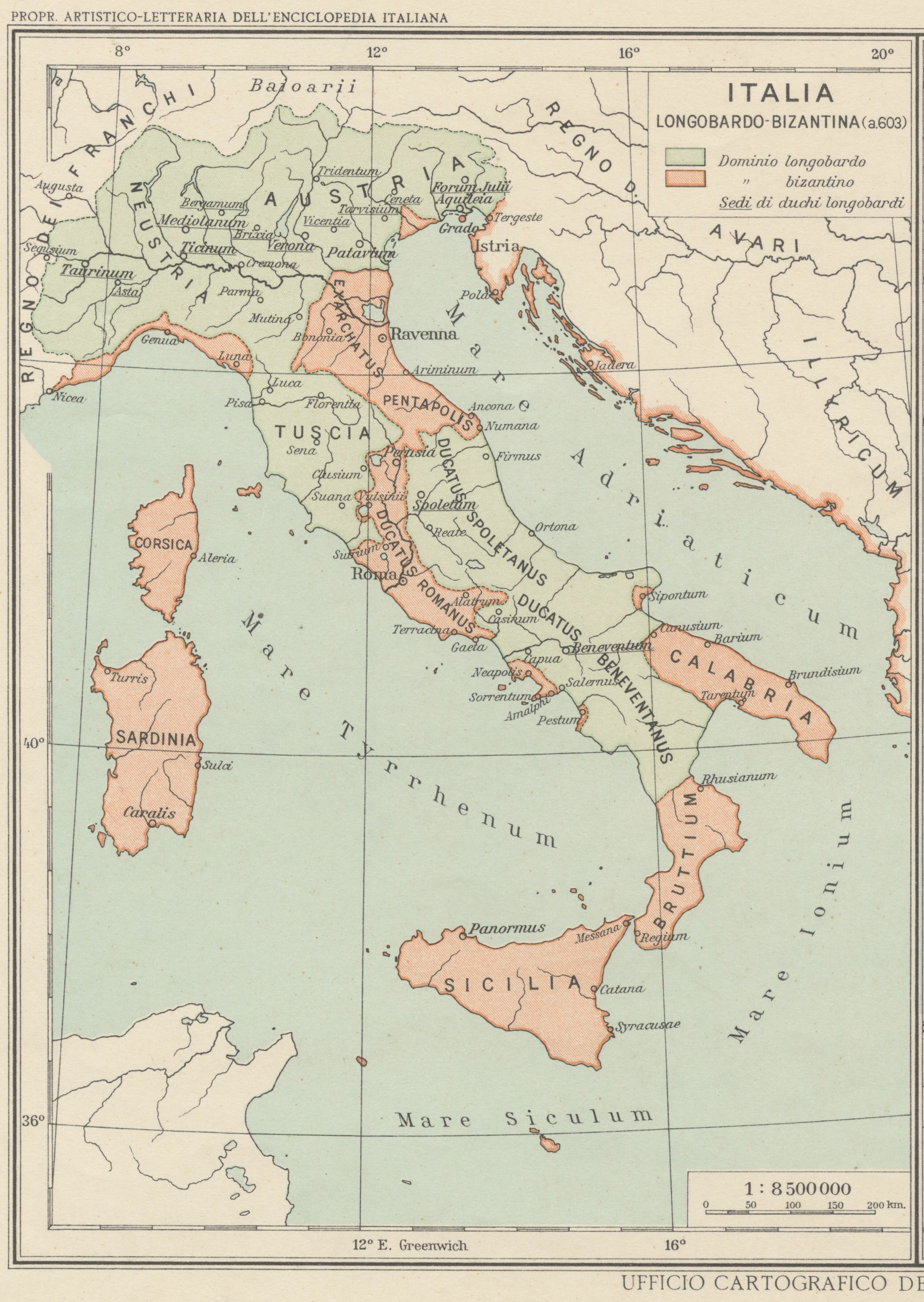
Map of Italy in 603

So highly esteemed across the Lombard kingdom was Theodelinda that when Authari died, she was asked to remain in power and to choose a successor. Historian Roger Collins has misgivings with this claim—which stems from Paul the Deacon (Note: Despite frequently and consistently pointing out the flaws and political antagonism of queens and duchesses throughout his texts, Paul the Deacon makes an exception with Theodelinda, who he depicts in a very favorable light, making her into a heroine.)—and instead, asserts that both political bargaining or naked force were more likely attributable to her choice. Whatever the real situation, a mere two months after Authari's death, Theodelinda picked Agilulf as her next husband and the two were wed. (Note: The same year that Agilulf assumed the Lombard throne, Pope Pelagius II had died and Gregory the Great became pontiff.) She thereafter exerted much influence in restoring Nicene Christianity to a position of primacy in Italy against its rival, Arian Christianity. Her reach extended across most of the Italian peninsula between the Apennines and the Alps.

While her husband Agilulf retained his Arian faith, he allowed his son with Theodelinda to be baptized a Catholic. The Lombard king faced trouble from his dukes, who were convinced that he had consigned himself instead to the faith of the conquered. Agilulf did not permit Theodelinda's faith to shape his policies against the Byzantines. Frequently, Theodelinda corresponded with Pope Gregory (590–604) in letters, some of which are recorded by the eighth-century historian, Paul the Deacon. Some of the content in these letters concerned her husband's conversion. To further promulgate the Christian faith of the Catholics, she also welcomed Catholic missionaries across her realm. Taking full advantage of her piety and possibly to incentivize her continued Catholic proclivities, Pope Gregory sent her a series of silver ampullae of Syro-Palestinian craftsmanship, a gospel casket, and a golden cross from Byzantium. The cross was gem-encrusted and was meant as a symbol of the "impending Kingdom of God". (Note: Historian Johannes Fried relates that this cross is known as the "Gregory crucifix" and is well preserved to this day.)

=== Regent ===
Shortly before Agilulf's death in 616, he named Theodelinda co-regent for their son Adaloald, and once he reached maturity, she remained co-ruler over the kingdom.

For a period of some thirty-five years, Theodelinda was queen of the Lombards. Perhaps to further exhibit her faith, she constructed a Catholic cathedral dedicated to St. John the Baptist at Monza (near Milan) and richly endowed it. Her support for the Catholic faith also included the establishment of monasteries—one at Bobbio, and later one at Pedona, among others, according to Paul the Deacon.

Within "the treasure house" that is the cathedral at Monza, one finds a detailed sculpture of a mother hen and her chicks made of gilded silver, which was likely another gift from Pope Gregory. (Note: The famous treasure of Monza contains the Iron Crown of Lombardy and the theca persica, enclosing a text from the Gospel of John, sent by Pope Gregory to her for her son Adaloald. Another of the gifts of this pope to the Lombard queen was a cruciform encolpion (reliquary) containing a portion of the True Cross. The history of the queen and her connection with the famous Iron Crown of Lombardy are narrated in the frescoes painted in the Theodelinda Chapel in the Monza Cathedral, work by Ambrogio and Gregorio Zavattari (1444).)
