= Pei Ju =

Chinese cartographer and chancellor (547–627)

Pei Ju 裴矩
- Born: 547; Yuncheng, Shanxi
- Died: 627 (aged 79–80)
- Other names: Hongda (弘大); Duke Jing of Anyi (安邑敬公); Pei Shiju (裴世矩)
- Occupations: Cartographer, diplomat, politician, writer
- Children: Pei Xuanji; Pei Fenggao; Pei Shanchang; Pei Shuying
- Father: Pei Nazhi

Pei Ju (547 (Note: Both the Old Book of Tang and the New Book of Tang implied, but failed to explicitly state, that Pei Ju was 79 when Emperor Taizong took the throne in 626. The Book of Sui gave no age for him at all.) – 3 October 627), birth name Pei Shiju, courtesy name Hongda, formally Duke Jing of Anyi, was a Chinese cartographer, diplomat, politician, and writer who lived in the Sui and Tang dynasties, briefly serving as a chancellor during the reign of Emperor Gaozu of Tang. He was praised by traditional Chinese historians for his ability and lack of corruption, but blamed for flattering Emperor Yang of Sui and practically directly contributing to Sui's downfall by encouraging many external military campaigns that drained Sui's resources. Modern historians have questioned these assessments: Arthur F. Wright labelled the latter judgement in the Zizhi tongjian a "particularly blatant piece of editorializing" and "absurd ... beyond doubt."

== Background ==
Pei Ju's clan was originally from Hedong Commandery (河東, roughly modern Yuncheng, Shanxi). His grandfather Pei Tuo (裴佗) was an official for Northern Wei, and his father Pei Nazhi (裴訥之) served as an official during Northern Wei's branch successor state Eastern Wei and Eastern Wei's successor state Northern Qi. Pei Nazhi died when Pei Ju was young, and Pei Ju was raised by his uncle Pei Rangzhi (裴讓之), himself a famed official during the time.

In his youth, Pei Ju was known for his knowledge and intelligence. He served on the staff of Gao Zhen (高貞) the Prince of Beiping and then of Gao Renying (高仁英) the Prince of Gaoping, both sons of Emperor Wucheng of Northern Qi. After Northern Qi was destroyed by rival Northern Zhou in 577, it was said that Pei was stuck at his position. When the Northern Zhou general Yang Jian served as the commandant at Ding Province (定州, roughly modern Baoding, Hebei), he invited Pei to serve as his secretary. Pei later left Yang Jian's service when his mother died, to observe a mourning period. In 580, Yang Jian seized power as regent over the young Emperor Jing of Northern Zhou. He sent messengers to summon Pei, and Pei served on his staff as a secretary.

== During Emperor Wen's reign ==
In 581, Yang Jian had Emperor Jing yield the throne to him, ending Northern Zhou and establishing the Sui dynasty as its Emperor Wen. Pei Ju became a mid-level official in the new dynasty's government. In 589, when Emperor Wen sent forces to conquer the rival Chen dynasty and to unite China, Pei Ju served as a secretary to Emperor Wen's son Yang Guang the Prince of Jin, the commander for the overall operation. After Chen's capital Jiankang fell and the emperor Chen Shubao was captured, Yang Guang had his assistant Gao Jiong and Pei collect the Chen archives. In 590, Pei was ordered to head to the Lingnan region (嶺南, i.e., modern Guangdong, Guangxi, and northern Vietnam) to comfort the people there, but while he was still traveling there, nearly all of former Chen territory, with the people unfamiliar with and resenting Sui laws, erupted into rebellion. Emperor Wen initially recalled Pei, but Pei requested permission to continue, and Emperor Wen allowed him. He gathered several thousand soldiers at Nankang (南康, in modern Ganzhou, Jiangxi) and defeated and killed the rebel general Zhou Shiju (周師舉), who served under Wang Zhongxuan (王仲宣). He then approached Guang Province (廣州, roughly modern Guangzhou, Guangdong), where Wang was stationed, and Wang's forces, in fear, collapsed. In all, Pei pacified more than 20 provinces, commissioning governors and county magistrates in Emperor Wen's name. After he returned to Chang'an, Emperor Wen was pleased and praised Pei greatly. He created Pei the Duke of Wenxi and awarded him a large cache of silk. He also made Pei the assistant minister of census, and then Neishi Shilang (內史侍郎), the deputy head of the legislative bureau of the government (內史省, Neishi Sheng).

At that time, one of the major threats that Sui was facing was from Eastern Tujue, to the north, particularly because its Dulan Khan Ashina Yongyulü had married Northern Zhou's Princess Qianjin, who hated Yang for destroying Northern Zhou's imperial Yuwen clan. In 593, Pei Ju served as a Sui emissary to Eastern Tujue, and he revealed to Ashina Yongyulü that Princess Qianjin had been committing adultery, and then further persuaded Ashina Yongyulü's nephew and subordinate khan Tuli Khan Ashina Rangan that if he was able to get Princess Qianjin killed, Sui would be willing to let him marry a Sui princess. Ashina Rangan therefore convinced Ashina Yongyulü that Princess Qianjin should be killed, and Ashina Yongyulü killed Princess Qianjin. Later, Ashina Rangan was in fact allowed to marry Sui's Princess Anyi, and this led to a break between him and Ashina Yongyulü. Emperor Wen put Ashina Rangan under Sui protection, created him Qimin Khan, and, after Princess Anyi's death, gave him Princess Yicheng in marriage. He also launched armies against Dulan Khan and the subordinate Datou Khan Ashina Dianjue, to protect Ashina Rangan. In one of those attacks, commanded by Shi Wansui (史萬歲) the Duke of Taiping, against Ashina Dianjue, Pei served as Shi's assistant, and they achieved a great victory, but once they returned to Chang'an, Shi was falsely accused of being an adherent of the crown prince Yang Yong, with whom Emperor Wen was already displeased (and would eventually depose later that year in favor of Yang Guang) and executed, and Pei was given no rewards. Soon, Emperor Wen against sent Pei as an emissary to Ashina Rangan to comfort him and his troops; upon return to Chang'an, Pei was made deputy to the prime minister Yang Su. In 601, when Emperor Wen's wife Empress Dugu died, there were few written regulations about an empress' funeral, so new regulations were written by Pei and Niu Hong (牛弘). Emperor Wen subsequently made him the minister of civil service affairs, and Pei was considered capable at that position.

== During Emperor Yang's reign ==
In 604, Emperor Wen died—a death that traditional historians mostly believe to be a murder ordered by Yang Guang, although they admitted a lack of direct evidence—and was succeeded by Yang Guang (as Emperor Yang). Emperor Yang soon started the reconstruction of Luoyang to serve as the eastern capital, and he put Pei Ju in charge of building the governmental offices, which Pei completed in nine months.

Meanwhile, there was a substantial central Asian merchant trade with Sui at Zhangye (張掖, in modern Zhangye, Gansu), and Emperor Yang put Pei in charge of the merchant operations there. Pei knew that Emperor Yang had great ambitions of territorial expansion, and when he met with central Asian merchants, he would get information from them as to the geographical features and customs of their states. He wrote a three-volume work entitled the Maps of and Notes About the Western Regions (西域圖記, of which only the preface is still extant), and he submitted it to Emperor Yang, urging reopening of relations with and subjugation of the Xiyu states. Emperor Yang summoned Pei to discuss with him, and Pei further convinced him that Xiyu was full of treasure and that the large nearby state, Tuyuhun, could be easily conquered. Emperor Yang was enticed, and he put Pei in charge of planning the subjugation of Xiyu states and conquest of Tuyuhun.

In 608, Pei persuaded the Tiele to attack Tuyuhun. Tuyuhun's khan Murong Fuyun initially sought aid from Sui, but when Emperor Yang sent his cousin Yang Xiong (楊雄) the Prince of Ande and Yuwen Shu the Duke of Xu toward Tuyuhun, Murong Fuyun distrusted them and fled. Sui forces then attacked him, greatly defeating him and forcing him to flee further, seizing Tuyuhun territory and putting it under Sui control. Later that year, when Emperor Yang was set to offer sacrifices to the spirits of Mount Heng, Pei persuaded emissaries from 27 Xiyu states, headed by Qu Boya (麴伯雅) the King of Gaochang and Ashina Tutun (阿史那吐屯), the Western Tujue general in charge of Yiwu (伊吾, in modern Hami Prefecture, Xinjiang), to pay homage to him and to assist in offering sacrifices. Emperor Yang was greatly pleased by this and greatly awarded both Pei and all of the Xiyu emissaries. Around the same time, Emperor Yang made Pei Ju, along with Yu Shiji, Niu Hong, Su Wei, Yuwen Shu, Zhang Jin (張瑾), and Pei Yun (裴蘊) in charge of selecting and promoting officials, and they were known as the "seven nobles of officialdom." However, it was said that the actual selective powers were in Yu's hands, and that Yu became exceedingly corrupt, making recommendations based on the amount of bribes that he received. Pei Ju, however, was known and praised for not accepting bribes.

In 610, when Emperor Yang visited the headquarters of Ashina Rangan—who had, by this point, with Sui support, become the ruler of the Eastern Turkic Khaganate (Dong Tujue)—the emissary from Goguryeo happened to be at Ashina Rangan's headquarters as well, and Ashina Rangan had him meet with Emperor Yang. Pei then suggested to Emperor Yang that Goguryeo should be subjugated—pointing out that Goguryeo territory was formerly ruled by the Han dynasty and Jin dynasty. Emperor Yang was enticed, and he issued an edict, to be taken back to Goguryeo's king Gao Yuan (King Yeongyang), in which he ordered King Yeongyang to visit him at Zhuo Commandery (涿郡, roughly modern Beijing) in 611 or face consequences. King Yeongyang, in fear, began to prepare for war, as did Emperor Yang, believing that conquest would be easy. (The subsequent campaigns against Goguryeo in 612, 613, and 614, particularly the one in 612, however, was disastrous for Sui, as great human and material costs were expended with only minimal territorial gains, leading eventually to Sui's downfall.)

In 611, after Western Tujue's Chuluo Khan Ashina Daman similarly refused to visit Emperor Yang, Pei suggested forming an alliance with Ashina Daman's subordinate Ashina Shekui, who had been requesting to marry a Sui princess. Emperor Yang agreed, and subsequently, Ashina Shekui attacked Ashina Daman, defeating him and forcing him to flee to Gaochang. Emperor Yang then sent Pei to Gaochang to persuade Ashina Daman to come to Sui, and Ashina Daman did; he subsequently stayed in China and did not return to his own land. Emperor Yang, pleased with this development, awarded Pei with a sable coat and jewels that Ashina Daman offered as tribute.

Meanwhile, another strategy offered by Pei to keep the Eastern Turks divided and controlled backfired. Pei had become apprehensive that Ashina Rangan's son and successor the Shibi Khan was becoming strong and difficult to control and had therefore suggested that Emperor Yang offer to marry a princess to the khan's brother Ashina Chiji (阿史那叱吉). Ashina Chiji, in fear, declined. This already brought resentment from the khan, when Pei tricked the Shibi Khan's strategist Shishuhu (史蜀胡) into meeting him at Mayi (present-day Shuozhou, Shanxi) and then killed him, claiming that Shishuhu was planning to rebel against the khan. Shibi Khan, knowing that the accusation was false, became resolved to rebel against Sui. In the fall of 615, when Emperor Yang was visiting Yanmen Commandery on the northern frontier, the khan launched a surprise attack on the area, overrunning most of its Chinese settlements. Warned by the khan's wife Princess Yicheng—a member of the imperial family who had been well treated by Empress Xiao during an earlier visit—the emperor, empress, and their entourage escaped to the commandery seat at present-day Daixian. The Turks besieged them there on September 11. Emperor Yang put Yu and Pei in charge of planning the military counteroffensive, but was only able to get the siege lifted after he followed the advice of the empress's brother Xiao Yu and sent messengers to Princess Yicheng, who was directing military affairs at the Turkish capital in her husband's absence. She falsely informed Shibi Khan that the Turks were under attack from the north, and so the khan lifted the siege. After the end of the siege, Pei accompanied Emperor Yang back to Luoyang, and was subsequently in charge of receiving a delegation led by Ashina Shekui's son.

In 616, Emperor Yang, despite the fact that most of his territory was engulfed by agrarian rebellions, went from Luoyang to Jiangdu (江都, in modern Yangzhou, Jiangsu). Pei accompanied him, but when Pei subsequently warned him about agrarian rebellions—which he did not wish to hear about—he ordered Pei back to Chang'an to be in charge of again receiving Xiyu emissaries, an effective banishment, although he did not push the issue when Pei subsequently claimed illness. In 617, when news that the general Li Yuan had rebelled at Taiyuan (太原, in modern Taiyuan, Shanxi) and was attacking Chang'an, having defeated and captured the major general Qutu Tong (屈突通), Emperor Yang was alarmed, and Pei suggested returning to Luoyang. Emperor Yang, while not listening to Pei, restored him to his posts. Pei, seeing that Emperor Yang's elite Xiaoguo Army (驍果), which Emperor Yang had taken to Jiangdu with him, had its soldiers deserting due to their missing their northern homes, treated the Xiaoguo officers with respect while suggesting that the soldiers be given wives in Jiangdu. Emperor Yang agreed, and Xiaoguo soldiers were given wives (and permitted to marry those with whom they had previously had secret liaisons).

In spring 618, Xiaoguo officers nevertheless rose in a coup, led by Yuwen Huaji (Yuwen Shu's son). They killed Emperor Yang and a large number of high-level officials, but as Pei was kind to them, they spared Pei. Yuwen Huaji declared Emperor Yang's nephew Yang Hao the Prince of Qin emperor, and began to head back north with the Xiaoguo Army.

== Under Yuwen Huaji and Dou Jiande ==
Yuwen Huaji made Pei Ju the co-head (僕射, Pushe) of the executive bureau of the government (尚書省, Shangshu Sheng). After he poisoned Yang Hao and declared himself emperor of a state of Xu (許) later in 618, he created Pei the Duke of Cai. He was subsequently captured and executed by another rebel ruler, Dou Jiande the Prince of Xia, in 619. Dou, as his government was then unorganized, had Pei draft the governmental organization and continue to serve as Pushe in his government, often inquiring Pei as to Sui governance and other related matters.

In 621, with Li Shimin (a son of Li Yuan, who had in 618 established the Tang dynasty as its Emperor Gaozu) attacking Wang Shichong the Emperor of Zheng, Dou, believing that if Tang destroyed Zheng, his own Xia state would be cornered, went to Wang's aid, but was defeated by Li Shimin at the Battle of Hulao and captured. His wife Empress Cao and a number of generals fled back to the Xia capital Ming Prefecture (洺州, in modern Handan, Hebei) and considered supporting an adoptive son of Dou Jiande as Prince of Xia and continuing to resist Tang, but at the urging of the official Qi Shanxing (齊善行), Xia forces were disbanded. Qi, Pei, and Empress Cao's brother Cao Dan (曹旦) then escorted her and surrendered to Tang.

== During Emperor Gaozu's reign ==
Emperor Gaozu created Pei Ju the Duke of Anyi and had him serve as the head of his son and crown prince Li Jiancheng's household. He also had Pei and Yu Shinan (Yu Shiji's brother) draft regulations on various ceremonies, and the regulations were described as appropriate and praised by scholars. In 624, he was made acting Shizhong (侍中)—the head of the examination bureau of the government (門下省, Menxia Sheng) and a post considered one for a chancellor.

In 625, Western Tujue's Yehu Khan Ashina Tong requested a marriage with a Tang princess. Emperor Gaozu consulted Pei, who believed that such a marriage would be beneficial to Tang, and Emperor Gaozu therefore agreed. (However, Ashina Tong, fearful of anger of Eastern Tujue's Jiali Khan Ashina Duobi, did not actually carry out the marriage.) Later in 625, Pei was no longer Shizhong and therefore apparently no longer chancellor.

In 626, Li Shimin the Prince of Qin, then in an intense rivalry with Li Jiancheng and fearing that Li Jiancheng would kill him, ambushed Li Jiancheng and another brother who supported Li Jiancheng, Li Yuanji the Prince of Qi, at Xuanwu Gate and killed them. After Li Jiancheng's and Li Yuanji's deaths, their troops nevertheless continued to battle Li Shimin's, and Li Shimin asked Pei to appear before them and encourage them to disband, which they did. When Li Shimin then effectively forced Emperor Gaozu to create him crown prince and then reorganized the government, Pei was made the minister of census.

== During Emperor Taizong's reign ==
Pei Ju continued to serve as minister of census after Emperor Gaozu yielded the throne to Li Shimin in winter 626 (as Emperor Taizong). Also in winter 626, Pei suggested that a small amount of silk be distributed per household for the people who had been adversely affected by Tujue incursions—a suggestion that Emperor Taizong rejected as impractical, pointing out that households had various sizes, instead ordering that the silk be distributed by household size. However, later that year, Pei received approval from Emperor Taizong, when he counseled Emperor Taizong not to execute a low level official who had received a bribe in a sting operation—pointing out the inequity in executing someone for falling trap to a sting operation. Pei died in October 627 and was posthumously honored.
