= Heroes of Sui and Tang Dynasties =

- Official poster
- Chinese: 隋唐英雄
- Hanyu Pinyin: Suí Táng Yiōngxióng
- Genre: Historical
- Based on: Rulian Jushi Shuotang
- Written by: Zhao Ruiyong, Xu Haibin, Du Wenhe, Zhou Su, Wu Guo'en, Zhang Yong, Luo Ye
- Directed by: Li Hantao
- Starring: Dicky Cheung; Winston Chao; Liu Xiaoqing; Lan Yan; Yu Shaoqun; Wezei Purba; Kou Hsi-Shun; Yoki Sun; Jang Seo-hee
- Opening theme: Dicky Cheung - Shen Qu (literally Divine Comedy)
- Ending theme: Dicky Cheung - Zhen Yingxiong (literally Real Heroes)
- Country of origin: China
- Original language: Mandarin
- No. of episodes: 120

Production
- Executive producer: Zhao Ruiyong
- Production location: Hengdian World Studios
- Production companies: Zhejiang Great Wall Entertainment Co., Ltd

Original release
- Network: Hunan TV, Jiangsu TV
- Release: December 3, 2012 – January 22, 2013

Heroes of Sui and Tang Dynasties 1 & 2 (Chinese: 隋唐英雄) is a 2012 Chinese historical television series directed by Li Hantao. It was first aired on Hunan Television in China in 2012. The series is based on the events in the reign of Emperor Yang of Sui during the Sui dynasty and Tang dynasty. The series stars Dicky Cheung, Winston Chao, Liu Xiaoqing, Yu Shaoqun, Wezei, Kou Hsi-Shun, Yoki Sun, Jang Seo-hee, and Lan Yan. It is followed by the sequel Heroes of Sui and Tang Dynasties 3 & 4.

== Cast ==
=== Sui dynasty ===
- Kou Hsi-Shun as Emperor Wen of Sui.
- Joan Chen as Empress Dugu.
- Tino Bao as Yang Yong.
- Winston Chao as Emperor Yang of Sui.
- Wu Di as Yang Xiu.
- Guo Hui as Yang Liang.
- Liu Xiaoqing as Empress Xiao.
- Lan Yan as Consort Chen.
- Jang Seo-hee as Consort Zhang Lihua.
- Yoki Sun as Consort Yang.
- Yang Boxiong as Yang You.
- Wei Zongwan as Yuwen Huaji.
- Edward Zhang as Yuwen Chengdu.
- Zhang Guoliang as Yuwen Guang.
- Shan Wei as Hong Fu Nü.
- Zhang Xu as Li Jing.
- Yao Jianxiong as Li Gang.
- Liu Honglin as Han Qinhu.
- Xu Kun as He Ruobi.
- Ye Zuxin as Pei Yuanqing.
- Xu Xiaodong as Wang Shichong.
- Li Yi as Wang Chuchu.
- Wang Jinxin as Meng Haigong.
- Qin Fanxiang as Zhu Can.
- Lu Yi as Dou Jiande.
- Han Yanda as Tang Bi.
- Liu Mingyu as Gao Tansheng.
- Liu Yue as Du Fuwei.
- Liu Binglei as Shan Xiongxin.
- Wu Youxi as Zhang Heng.
- Pan Haicheng as Yang Yichen.
- Chen Kuangkuang as Wang Bodang.
- Zhang Bojun as Yang Lin.
- Yang Hongwu as Li Mi.
- Yue Junling as Su Wei.
- Lei Lei as Chen Shubao.

=== Tang dynasty ===
- Du Zhiguo as Emperor Gaozu of Tang.
- Kara Hui as Empress Dou.
- Qiao Zhenyu as Li Jiancheng.
- Yu Shaoqun as Emperor Taizong of Tang.
- Liang Jingjing as Empress Zhangsun.
- Dicky Cheung as Cheng Yaojin.
- Zhang Rui as Luo Cheng.
- Candy Tu as Xin Yue'e.
- Wezei Purba as Qin Shubao.
- Zhao Shuai as Yuchi Gong.
- Meng Zhaozhong as Zhangsun Wuji.
- Zhao Jianzhong as Pei Ji.
- Chen Jiming as Wei Zheng.
- Lin Shu as Luo Shixin.
- Chen Liangping as Li Shiji.
- Fu Yiming as Liu Wenjing.
- Zhao Qiusheng as Shi Danai.
- Xu Jun as Fang Xuanling.
- Zhou Ying as Du Ruhui.
- Li Yonglin as Li Yuanba.

== Production ==
The series took place in Hengdian World Studios. Filming also took place Hangzhou.

The series's on a budget of ¥250 million.

== Release ==
It was first aired on Hunan Television in China on 3 December 2012.

== Awards and nominations ==
Year	Award	Category	Nominated work	Result
2014	1st Hengdian Film and TV Festival of China	Best Supporting Actor	Ye Zuxin	Won

== International broadcast ==
Country	Network(s)/Station(s)	Series premiere	Title
Thailand	MONO 29	April 2015	สุยถัง ศึกสองราชวงศ์ (Sui Tang Suek Song Rajawong)
