= Timeline of the Sui dynasty =

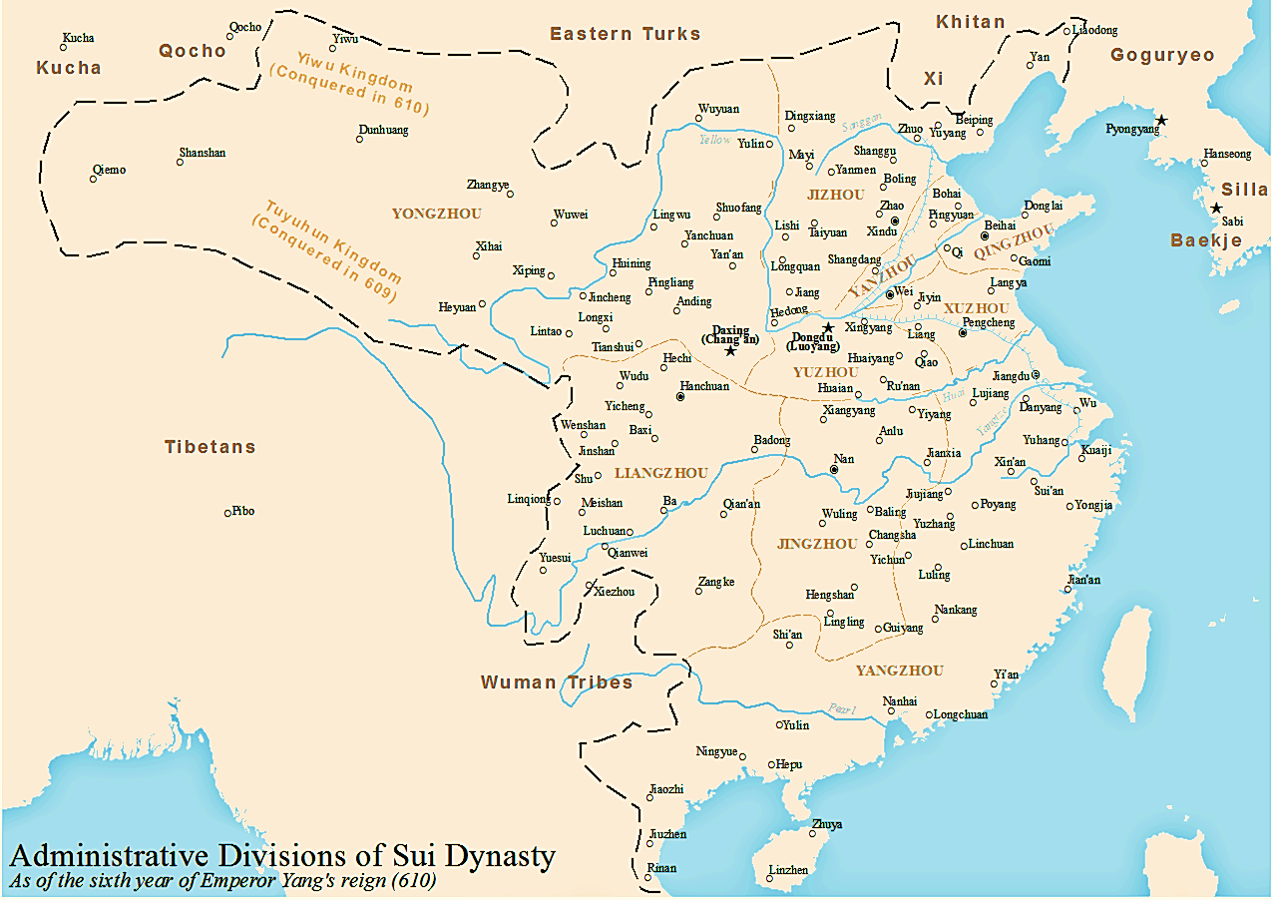
Sui dynasty

This is a timeline of the Sui dynasty.

== 580s ==
Year	Date	Event
581	4 March	Yang Jian (Emperor Wen of Sui) replaces the Northern Zhou with the Sui dynasty
582		Emperor Xuan of Chen dies and is succeeded by Chen Shubao
583		Emperor Wen of Sui moves into Daxingcheng (Xi'an, Shaanxi) and abolishes the commanderies while promulgating the Kaihuang Code
584		Digs the Guangtong Canal
587		Annexes Western Liang
588		Launches expedition against the Chen dynasty
589		Takes Jiankang and annexes the Chen dynasty; so ends the Northern and Southern dynasties

== 590s ==
Year	Date	Event
590		Yang Su crushes rebellions in annexed Chen territory
592		Emperor Wen of Sui sends out commissioners to implement the equal-field system throughout the realm
593		The Cuanman rebel in Yunnan
593		The Renshou Palace is built west of the capital
593		The writing of National Histories by private individuals is banned
594		Severe drought hits Guanzhong but Emperor Wen of Sui leads its people to Luoyang for food
595		Construction of the Anji Bridge begins
597		Tiantai sect founder Zhiyi dies
597		A campaign is launched against the Cuanman
598		Goguryeo–Sui War: First expedition against Goguryeo fails
599		Chief minister Gao Jiong deprived of power
599		Yami Qaghan flees to the Sui dynasty

== 600s ==
Year	Date	Event
601		90,000 Turks submit
602		Sui–Former Lý War: Sui forces under Liu Fang annex the Early Lý dynasty
602		Sui destroys the Cuanman
603		Yami Qaghan takes over Tulan Qaghan's lands after he dies
604	13 August	Emperor Wen of Sui dies and is succeeded by Yang Guang (Emperor Yang of Sui)
604		Yang Liang rebels in Bingzhou but is defeated
605		Sui forces under Liu Fang invade Champa and sack its capital
605		Construction of a new Luoyang and the Tongji Canal begin
605		The Anji Bridge is completed
605		Emperor Yang of Sui visits Jiangdu
606		Luoyang is completed and Emperor Yang of Sui returns from Jiangdu
607		Yami Qaghan visits Emperor Yang of Sui in Luoyang
607		Gao Jiong is killed
607		Ono no Imoko visits China
607		The Sui dynasty sends expeditions to an island known as Liuqiu, which may or may not be Taiwan, but is probably Ryukyu
608		The Yongji Canal is dug
608		Pei Shiqing accompanies Ono no Imoko back to Japan
609		Emperor Yang of Sui visits Zhangye

== 610s ==
Year	Date	Event
610		Emperor Yang of Sui visits Jiangdu
610		Construction of the Jiangnan Canal begins
611		Goguryeo–Sui War: Emperor Yang of Sui arrives at Zhuojun to prepare for war with Goguryeo
611		Wang Bo (王薄) rebels in Changbaishan (Zouping, Shandong)
612		Goguryeo–Sui War: The invasion of Goguryeo fails
613		Goguryeo–Sui War: Emperor Yang of Sui is forced to withdraw from the second invasion due to Yang Xuangan's rebellion in Liyang
613		Du Fuwei and Fu Gongshi rebel
614		Goguryeo–Sui War: Another invasion fails
615		Shibi Khan lays siege to Yanmen
616		Emperor Yang of Sui leaves for Jiangdu
617		Li Mi and Zhai Rang rebel, seizing Luokou Granary and Huiluo Granary
617		Li Yuan, regent of Taiyuan, rebels and takes Daxingcheng
618	11 April	Emperor Yang of Sui is killed by strangulation in a coup led by his general Yuwen Huaji in Jiangdu
618	12 June	Li Yuan (Tang Gaozu - note that Tang emperor naming convention uses the posthumous Temple Name) deposes Emperor Gong of Sui and founds the Tang dynasty; so ends the Sui dynasty

== Bibliography ==
- Crespigny, Rafe (2007), A Biographical Dictionary of Later Han to the Three Kingdoms (23-220 AD), Brill
- Graff, David A. (2002), Medieval Chinese Warfare, 300-900, Routledge
- Knapp, Ronald G. (1980), China's Island Frontier: Studies in the Historical Geography of Taiwan, The University of Hawaii
- Taylor, K.W. (2013), A History of the Vietnamese, Cambridge University Press
- Xiong, Victor Cunrui (2009), Historical Dictionary of Medieval China, United States of America: Scarecrow Press, Inc., ISBN 978-0-8108-6053-7
- Yang, Bin (2008a), "Chapter 3: Military Campaigns against Yunnan: A Cross-Regional Analysis", Between Winds and Clouds: The Making of Yunnan (Second Century BCE to Twentieth Century CE), Columbia University Press
