= Yang Xiu =

Yang Xiu is the name of:

- Yang Xiu (Han dynasty) (175–219), advisor to Cao Cao
- Yang Xiu (Sui dynasty) (c. 570–618), prince in Sui dynasty
