= Dugu Qieluo =

Empress of China from 581 to 602

Dugu Qieluo 獨孤伽羅

Empress of the Sui dynasty
- Tenure: 4 March 581 – 10 September 602
- Born: 544
- Died: 10 September 602 (aged 57–58)
- Spouse: Emperor Wen of Sui
- Issue: Yang Lihua, Empress of Northern Zhou; Princess Xiangguo; Yang Yong, Prince of Fangling; Yang Guang, Emperor Yang of Sui; Princess Guangping; Yang Jun, Prince of Qin; Yang Xiu, Prince of Shu; Yang Awu, Princess Lanling; Yang Liang, Prince of Han
Names
- Family name: Dugu (獨孤); Given name: Qieluo (伽羅)
Posthumous name
- Empress Wenxian (文獻皇后)
- Clan: Dugu (by birth); Yang (by marriage)
- Dynasty: Sui (by marriage)
- Father: Dugu Xin
- Mother: Lady Cui

Dugu Qieluo or Dugu Jialuo (Chinese: 獨孤伽羅; 544 (Note: According to Empress Dugu's biography in volume 36 of the Book of Sui, she was 50 (by East Asian reckoning) when she died. By calculation, her birth year should be 553. However, her biography in volume 14 of the History of the Northern Dynasties records that she was 59 (by East Asian reckoning) when she died. If this record is correct, by calculation, her birth year should be 544. As her daughter Yang Lihua was born in 561, it is more likely that Empress Dugu was born in 544.) – 10 September 602 (Note: The Zizhi Tongjian recorded that Empress Dugu died on the jiazi day of the 8th month of the 2nd year of the Renshou era of Emperor Wen's reign. This date corresponds to 10 September 602 on the Gregorian calendar.)), formally Empress Wenxian (文獻皇后), was an empress of the Sui dynasty of China. She was the wife of Emperor Wen, who, on account of his love and respect for her, as well as an oath they made while they were young, did not have any concubines for at least most of their marriage, an extreme rarity among Chinese emperors. She also bore him all his children. However, she was domineering, ruthless, exceedingly powerful, and influential during her husband's reign, and assisted him in running the empire.

Empress Dugu held such dignity and rank that, through repeated examinations and trials, her name rose by virtue and competence; in external court she took part in the governance, and within the inner palace she ruled over the harem: Her position, coupled with her close relationship with the emperor, led them to be called the Two Saints or Two Ruler ("二圣"). Because she was jealous and filled with suspicion, she diminished the position of the concubines and attendants and did not establish the rank of the three noble consorts, lest anyone rise above her station or surpass her in authority. Also, her performances initially played an important role in the advancement of the empire, but in the succession system she was also a significant factor in its downfall. She was heavily involved in emperor's decision to divert the order of succession from their eldest son Yang Yong to the second son Yang Guang. Yang Guang ascended after his father's death as Emperor Yang, the last Sui emperor. Later, her nephew Li Yuan (later known as Emperor Gaozu) founded the Tang dynasty.

== Background ==
Dugu Qieluo was born in 544, as the seventh daughter of the Western Wei general Dugu Xin, who was of Xianbei ethnicity (or Xianbeinized Xiongnu). Her mother, Lady Cui (崔氏), was Han Chinese.

In 557, shortly after Western Wei was succeeded by Northern Zhou, Dugu Xin, who was impressed with Yang Jian, the son of his subordinate general Yang Zhong (楊忠), arranged the marriage between him and Dugu Qieluo. She was 13, and he was 16. (Note: going by Dugu's birth year being 544; Yang Jian was born in July 541.)

Shortly thereafter, Dugu Xin became implicated in a plot organized by the general Zhao Gui against the regent Yuwen Hu, and Yuwen Hu forced him to commit suicide.

Yang Jian and Lady Dugu loved each other dearly, and it was when they were both young that he swore an oath that he would never let another woman have his children. They ended up having five sons and five daughters.

In 568, after Yang Zhong's death, Yang Jian inherited the title of Duke of Sui, and Lady Dugu thereafter presumably carried the title of Duchess of Sui.

Duchess Dugu was one of the most honored women at the Northern Zhou court, as her sister was the wife of Emperor Ming, and her daughter, Yang Lihua, was the wife of Emperor Xuan. Despite her honored status, however, she was said to be humble. On one occasion, when the erratic Emperor Xuan was angry with Empress Yang and ordered her to commit suicide, Duchess Dugu found out and went into the palace, earnestly begging Emperor Xuan's forgiveness. Emperor Xuan relented and spared Empress Yang.

In 580, Emperor Xuan, who had by then passed the throne to his young son Emperor Jing (by his concubine Zhu Manyue) and become retired emperor, but who was retaining imperial powers, died suddenly. Yang Jian seized power as regent. It was at that time when Duchess Dugu sent Yang Jian a message that stated, "This is like riding a wild beast. You will not be able to come off of it. You need to fight hard to stay on." After Yang Jian defeated the general Yuchi Jiong, who rose against him after he took power, he had Emperor Jing yield the throne to him in 581, ending Northern Zhou and establishing Sui dynasty as its Emperor Wen. He named Duchess Dugu Empress and their oldest son, Yang Yong, Crown Prince, while granting their other children, including Northern Zhou's Empress Yang, royal titles.

== Life in power as an empress ==
=== Early in Emperor Wen's reign ===
Empress Dugu was said to be studious, and she and Emperor Wen often conferred with each other the important matters of state and rewards and punishments. Emperor Wen favored and respected her, and she and Emperor Wen became known as "the Two Holy Ones" inside the palace by officials, because she was openly interfering in the governing and she was helping to alleviate the problems. As a result, she excelled in her role as a wise counselor, a virtuous assistant, and the mother of the empire.

It was not infrequent that when he hosted imperial meetings she would accompany him almost all the way into the meeting hall and she often asked eunuchs to listen in on the meeting. When she believed that he made the wrong decisions, she would advise him to change. She would also usually wait near the meeting hall for the meeting to be done and then return with him to the palace. Whenever the emperor accepted the proposals and petitions sent by the officials, she was by his side and talked to the emperor and the accepted official in many matters.

As she lost her parents early in her life, she was particularly touched when she saw officials with both parents, and she would pay due respect to the officials' parents when she saw them.

When officials suggested that, in accordance with rules set in the Zhou dynasty, the officials' marriages must be approved by the Empress, she declined, believing that it was inappropriate for her to overly interfere in political matters.

She also lived frugally, and once, when Emperor Wen needed medicine for diarrhea that required ground pepper—then an exceedingly expensive spice that was more expensive than gold and which ladies of the court used for cosmetic purposes—he sought the ground pepper from her and found that she did not use it, on account of its overly expensive cost. Also once, when he wanted to reward the wife of his official Liu Song (劉嵩) with a gold-decorated dress, she also had none to give.

When her cousin, Cui Changren (崔長仁), committed crimes that called for the death penalty, Emperor Wen was initially considering pardoning on Empress Dugu account, but she stated that she could not, based on familial relations, break the laws, and Cui was executed.

She respected the official Gao Jiong, as his father, Gao Bin (高賓), served on her father's staff and was a trusted advisor for him.

She had, however, a poor relationship with her sister-in-law, the wife of Emperor Wen's brother, Yang Zan (楊瓚), the Prince of Teng—Northern Zhou's Princess Shenyang (daughter of Yuwen Tai, the father of the first three Northern Zhou emperors)–and Princess Shenyang used witchcraft to curse her. When Emperor Wen ordered Yang Zan to divorce Princess Shenyang, Yang Zan refused, and when Yang Zan died in 591, it was commonly believed that Emperor Wen poisoned Yang Zan.

=== Late in Emperor Wen's reign ===
In 595, the luxurious summer vacation palace, Renshou Palace (仁壽宮, in modern Baoji, Shaanxi), was completed by the general Yang Su. When the frugal Emperor Wen saw how luxurious the palace was, he was unhappy and angrily stated, "Yang Su expanded the efforts of the people to construct this palace. The people will despise me." Soon thereafter, however, when Empress Dugu arrived at the palace as well, she advised Emperor Wen to comfort Yang Su, and when he subsequently summoned Yang Su to the palace, she stated, "You know that this old couple had little to enjoy, so you decorated this palace in this way. Is it not that in doing so, you are being both faithful and filial?" She gave him a large award of money and silk.

In 598, Empress Dugu and her younger brother, Dugu Tuo (獨孤陀), born of different mothers, were embroiled in a mysterious scandal. It was said that Dugu Tuo, whose wife was a sister of Yang Su's, had a female servant named Xu Ani (徐阿尼), who worshipped cat spirits and was capable to have those spirits kill people for her. At this time, both Empress Dugu and Yang Su's wife, Lady Zheng, was seriously ill, and it was suspected that they were afflicted by cat spirits. Emperor Wen suspected Dugu Tuo and had the official Gao Jiong investigate and Gao reported that it was indeed Dugu Tuo who instigated the matter. Emperor Wen ordered Dugu Tuo and Lady Yang to commit suicide, but Empress Dugu went on a three-day hunger strike to try to save them, stating, "If Tuo had harmed the people, I would not dare to say anything, but his crime was on my account, and therefore I dare to beg you to spare his life." Dugu Tuo's younger brother, Dugu Zheng (獨孤整), also pleaded earnestly, and Emperor Wen spared them, reducing Dugu Tuo to commoner rank and forcing Lady Yang to become a Buddhist nun.

Over the years, the relationship between Emperor Wen and Empress Dugu was still largely loving. However, on one occasion, when Emperor Wen happened to see the beautiful granddaughter of Yuchi Jiong, who had been forced into slave labor after her grandfather's death, he had sexual relations with her. When Empress Dugu found out, she had Lady Yuchi killed. In anger, Emperor Wen rode away from the palace on a horse and refused to return. Gao Jiong and Yang Su had to track him down and urge him to return to the palace, with Gao stating, "Your Imperial Majesty, how can you abandon the empire on account of a woman?" When Emperor Wen did return to the palace after midnight, Empress Dugu was still waiting for him, and she wept and begged him for forgiveness. Gao and Yang Su subsequently hosted a banquet for them, and their differences went away.

When Empress Dugu heard that Gao Jiong, whom she had respected previously, refer to her as "a woman," she became secretly resentful of him. Later, she became particularly angry at Gao over his marital relations, as after his wife died, she suggested Emperor Wen find him another wife, but he declined, stating that he was getting old and beginning to lose sexual urges and did not need another wife—and soon thereafter, his concubine bore a son. Empress Dugu pointed out that, in effect, he was not truthful, and Emperor Wen began to distance himself from Gao. Further, in 598, when Gao, under Emperor Wen's duress, was forced to accompany Yang Liang, the Prince of Han, in a campaign against Goguryeo, a campaign that he opposed, the campaign ended in failure, and Empress Dugu blamed him for the failure, particularly after Yang Liang, angry that Gao was not following his orders, complained to her.

Another person who began to draw Empress Dugu's ire was her son, Yang Yong, the Crown Prince. When he was young, Emperor Wen and Empress Dugu had selected for him a wife from the honored Yuan clan, Northern Wei's imperial clan—the daughter of the official Yuan Xiaoju (元孝鉅). However, Yang Yong did not favor Crown Princess Yuan, and instead had many concubines, including his favorite Consort Yun, and he did not have any sons with Crown Princess Yuan. When the Crown Princess died in 591 after a brief illness, Empress Dugu suspected Yang Yong and/or Consort Yun of poisoning her, and rebuked Yang Yong.

The second son of Emperor Wen and Empress Dugu, Yang Guang, the Prince of Jin, who had ambitions of displacing his older brother, put on pretenses of living frugally (which pleased Emperor Wen) and loving no one but his wife Princess Xiao (which pleased Empress Dugu).

By 599, both Emperor Wen and Empress Dugu were considering replacing Yang Yong with Yang Guang, but when Empress Dugu once approached Gao with the issue, he stated firmly that the Crown Prince should not be replaced. Therefore, Empress Dugu suggested that Emperor Wen remove Gao and he was accused of crimes, removed from his office and reduced to commoner rank.

Meanwhile, Yang Guang was continuing to provoke Empress Dugu, falsely stating that he feared that Yang Yong would eventually put him to death. Yang Guang further entered into an alliance with Yang Su, with whom Yang Yong had a poor relationship, and Empress Dugu also told Yang Su to encourage Emperor Wen to depose Yang Yong. Subsequently, Yang Guang engaged Yang Yong's associate, Ji Wei (姬威), to falsely accuse Yang Yong of plotting treason.

In 600, after an investigation conducted by Yang Su, in which he manufactured evidence against Yang Yong, Emperor Wen deposed the Crown Prince and put him under house arrest, replacing him with Yang Guang.

In fall 602, Empress Dugu died, and Emperor Wen was greatly saddened, although he was comforted by Wang Shao (王劭), who submitted a petition in which he tried to use prophecies to show that Empress Dugu was, in fact, a Bodhisattva.

== Family ==
- Grandfather
  - Dugu Kuzhe (獨孤庫者)
- Father
  - General Dugu Xin (503–557), Western Wei general (司馬) and superior officer to Yang Zhong, Duke of Sui, Yang Jian's father; was implicated in a plot to overthrow regent Yuwen Hu in 557, shortly after his daughter's marriage, and forced to commit suicide
- Mother
  - Lady Cui (崔氏)
- Stepmothers
  - Dugu Xin's first wife, mother of Dugu Luo
  - Lady Guo (郭氏), Dugu Xin's second wife, mother of Dugu Shan, Dugu Mu, Dugu Cang, Dugu Shun, Dugu Tuo, and Dugu Zheng
- Half-brothers
  - Dugu Luo (獨孤羅) (534–599), courtesy name Luoren (羅仁)
  - Dugu Shan (獨孤善), Buddhist name Futuo (伏陀)
  - Dugu Mu (獨孤穆)
  - Dugu Cang (獨孤藏) (553–587), Xianbei name Bazang (拔臣), Buddhist name Damo (達磨)
  - Dugu Shun (獨孤順)
  - Dugu Tuo (獨孤陀), courtesy name Lixie (黎邪), married a sister of Yang Su
  - Dugu Zheng (獨孤整), served as Provincial Governor of Youzhou, later elevated to Marquess of Pingxiang (平鄉侯)
  - Dugu Zhen (獨孤震)
- Half-sisters
  - Lady Dugu (獨孤氏), Dugu Xin's fourth daughter; married Li Bing, Duke Ren of Tang; posthumously honored under the Tang dynasty as Empress Yuanzhen (元貞皇后)
  - Empress Dugu (d. 558), Dugu Xin's eldest daughter, married Emperor Ming of Northern Zhou sometime after 548
- Nephews
  - Dugu Ji (獨孤機), Duke of Teng (滕國公) and Provincial Governor of Cangzhou, son of Dugu Cang and his wife Lady Helan (賀蘭氏)
  - Two other sons of Dugu Cang and Lady Helan
  - Emperor Gaozu of Tang, son and elder child of Empress Yuanzhen and Li Bing
- Niece
  - Princess Tong'an (同安公主), daughter and younger child of Empress Yuanzhen and Li Bing
- Sons
  - Yang Yong (楊勇) (d. 604), the Crown Prince (created 581, deposed 600, executed by Emperor Yang of Sui 604)
  - Yang Guang (楊廣) (569 – 10 April 618), initially the Duke of Yanmen, later the Prince of Jin (created 581), later the Crown Prince (created 600), later Emperor Yang of Sui
  - Yang Jun (楊俊) (571–600), Prince Xiao of Qin (created 581, d. 600)
  - Yang Xiu (楊秀) (573–618), initially the Prince of Yue (created 581), later the Prince of Shu (created 581, reduced to commoner rank 602, killed by Yuwen Huaji 618)
  - Yang Liang (楊諒) (575–605), the Prince of Han (created 581, reduced to commoner rank 604)
- Daughters
  - Yang Lihua (楊麗華) (561–609), empress to Emperor Xuan of Northern Zhou; later the Princess Leping
  - Princess Xiangguo, married Li Changya (李長雅)
  - Princess Guangping, married Yuwen Jingli (宇文靜禮), son of Yuwen Qing (宇文慶)
  - Yang Awu (楊阿五) (573–604), the Princess Lanling; married firstly Wang Fengxiao (王奉孝); remarried after Wang's death to Liu Shu (柳述), who later became Minister of Defense under Emperor Yang

== In media ==
- Portrayed by Lee Heung-kam in the 1987 TV series The Grand Canal.
- Portrayed by Joan Chen in the 2012 TV series Sui Tang Yingxiong
- Portrayed by Song Jia in the 2013 TV series Heroes in Sui and Tang Dynasties.
- Portrayed by Pan Hong in the 2013 TV series Mulan.
- Portrayed by Hu Bingqing in the 2018 TV series The Legend of Dugu.
- Portrayed by Joe Chen in the 2019 TV series Queen Dugu.

== Notes and references ==
- Book of Sui, vol. 36.
- History of Northern Dynasties, vol. 14.
- Zizhi Tongjian, vols. 174, 175, 176, 177, 178, 179.

Chinese royalty
New title Dynasty established	Empress of the Sui dynasty 581–602	Succeeded by Empress Xiao
Preceded by Empress Sima Lingji of Northern Zhou	Empress of China (Northern/Western); 581–602	Succeeded by Empress Xiao
Preceded by Empress Wang of the Liang dynasty	Empress of China (Jiangling region); 587–602	Succeeded by Empress Xiao
Preceded by Empress Shen Wuhua of Chen dynasty	Empress of China (Southeastern); 589–602	Succeeded by Empress Xiao
