= Book of Sui =

Chinese official history (completed in 636)

- Pages from the Book of Sui, from a printed edition dating to 1297-1307
- Traditional Chinese: 隋書
- Simplified Chinese: 隋书
Transcriptions
Standard Mandarin
- Hanyu Pinyin: Suí Shū
Southern Min
- Hokkien POJ: Sûi-su

The Book of Sui (Chinese: 隋書; pinyin: Suí Shū) is the official history of the Sui dynasty, which ruled China in the years AD 581–618. It ranks among the official Twenty-Four Histories of imperial China. It was written by Yan Shigu, Kong Yingda, and Zhangsun Wuji, with Wei Zheng as the lead author. In the third year of the Zhenguan era of the Tang dynasty (629), Emperor Taizong of Tang ordered Fang Xuanling to supervise the completion of the Book of Sui, which was being compiled around the same time as other official histories were being written. The Book of Sui was completed in 636 AD, the same year as the Book of Chen was completed. It has one of the shortest gestation periods of any official history, being completed a mere 18 years after the end of the dynasty. As such, it is considered a primary source.

== Contents ==
The format used in the text follows the composite historical biography format (斷代紀傳體) established by Ban Gu in the Book of the Later Han with three sections: annals (紀), treatises (志), and biographies (傳). The extensive set of 30 treatises, sometimes translated as "monographs", in the Book of Sui was completed by a separate set of authors and added in 656 – 20 years after the original text was completed. The treatises cover the Liang, Chen, Northern Qi, and Northern Zhou dynasties in addition to the Sui. In addition to the Book of Liang and Book of Chen, the Book of Sui is an essential source of information on the subjects covered for those dynasties. The treatises on classics (經籍) are especially important because the Book of Sui is the only standard history including such a section since the Book of Han and contains essential bibliographical information for the period from the Later Han (25–220) to the Sui dynasty. The treatises were initially circulated as a separate set titled "Treatises of the History of the Five Dynasties" (五代史志).

=== Annals (帝紀) ===
#	Title	Translation	Notes
Volume 1	帝紀第1 高祖上	Gaozu	
Volume 2	帝紀第2 高祖下	Gaozu	
Volume 3	帝紀第3 煬帝上	Emperor Yang	
Volume 4	帝紀第4 煬帝下	Emperor Yang	
Volume 5	帝紀第5 恭帝	Yang You	

=== Treatises (志) ===
#	Title	Translation	Notes
Volume 6	志第1 禮儀1	Rites	
Volume 7	志第2 禮儀2	Rites	
Volume 8	志第3 禮儀3	Rites	
Volume 9	志第4 禮儀4	Rites	
Volume 10	志第5 禮儀5	Rites	
Volume 11	志第6 禮儀6	Rites	
Volume 12	志第7 禮儀7	Rites	
Volume 13	志第8 音樂上	Music	
Volume 14	志第9 音樂中	Music	
Volume 15	志第10 音樂下	Music	
Volume 16	志第11 律曆上	Rhythm and the Calendar	
Volume 17	志第12 律曆中	Rhythm and the Calendar	
Volume 18	志第13 律曆下	Rhythm and the Calendar	
Volume 19	志第14 天文上	Astronomy	
Volume 20	志第15 天文中	Astronomy	
Volume 21	志第16 天文下	Astronomy	
Volume 22	志第17 五行上	The Five Elements	
Volume 23	志第18 五行下	The Five Elements	
Volume 24	志第19 食貨	Food and Money	
Volume 25	志第20 刑法	Punishment and Law	
Volume 26	志第21 百官上	Government Offices	
Volume 27	志第22 百官中	Government Offices	
Volume 28	志第23 百官下	Government Offices	
Volume 29	志第24 地理上	Geography	
Volume 30	志第25 地理中	Geography	
Volume 31	志第26 地理下	Geography	
Volume 32	志第27 經籍1	Classics	
Volume 33	志第28 經籍2	Classics	
Volume 34	志第29 經籍3	Classics	
Volume 35	志第30 經籍4	Classics	

=== Biographies (列傳) ===
#	Title	Translation	Notes
Volume 36	列傳第1 后妃	Empresses	
Volume 37	列傳第2 李穆 梁睿	Li Mu; Liang Rui	
Volume 38	列傳第3 劉昉 鄭譯 柳裘 皇甫績 盧賁	Liu Fang; Zheng Yi; Liu Qiu; Huangfu Ji; Lu Ben	
Volume 39	列傳第4 于義 陰壽 陰世師 竇榮定 元景山 源雄 豆盧勣 豆盧毓 賀若誼	Yu Yi	
Volume 40	列傳第5 梁士彥 宇文忻 王誼 元諧 王世積 虞慶則 元胄	Liang Shiyan; Yuwen Xin; Wang Yi	
Volume 41	列傳第6 高熲 蘇威	Gao Jiong; Su Wei	
Volume 42	列傳第7 李德林 李百藥	Li Delin; Li Baiyao	
Volume 43	列傳第8 河間王弘 楊処綱 楊子崇 觀德王雄		
Volume 44	列傳第9 滕穆王瓚 道悼王靜 衛昭王爽 蔡王智積	Yang Zan; Yang Jing; Yang Shuang	
Volume 45	列傳第10 文四子	Four Princes of Wen	
Volume 46	列傳第11 趙煚 趙芬 楊尚希 長孫平 元暉 韋師 楊異 蘇孝慈 李雄 張煚		
Volume 47	列傳第12 韋世康 柳機	Wei Shikang	
Volume 48	列傳第13 楊素 弟約 從父文思 文紀	Yang Su	
Volume 49	列傳第14 牛弘	Niu Hong	
Volume 50	列傳第15 宇文慶 李禮成 元孝矩 郭榮 龐晃 李安	Yuwen Qing	
Volume 51	列傳第16 長孫覽 從子熾 熾弟晟		
Volume 52	列傳第17 韓擒虎 賀若弼	Han Qinhu; Heruo Bi	
Volume 53	列傳第18 達奚長儒 賀婁子幹 史萬歲 劉方	Daxi Zhangru; Shi Wansui; Liu Fang	
Volume 54	列傳第19 王長述 李衍 伊婁謙 田仁恭 元亨 杜整 李徹 崔彭		
Volume 55	列傳第20 杜彥 高勱 爾朱敞 周搖 獨孤揩 乞伏慧 張威 和洪 侯莫陳穎		
Volume 56	列傳第21 盧愷 令狐熙 薛胄 宇文㢸 張衡 楊汪		
Volume 57	列傳第22 盧思道 李孝貞 薛道衡	Lu Sidao; Li Xiaozhen	
Volume 58	列傳第23 明克讓 魏澹 陸爽 杜台卿 辛德源 柳䛒 許善心 李文博		
Volume 59	列傳第24 煬帝三男	Three Princes of Yang	
Volume 60	列傳第25 崔仲方 于仲文 段文振	Cui Zhongfang; Yu Zhongwen	
Volume 61	列傳第26 宇文述 雲定興 郭衍	Yuwen Shu	
Volume 62	列傳第27 王韶 元岩 劉行本 梁毗 柳彧 趙綽 裴肅		
Volume 63	列傳第28 樊子蓋 史祥 元壽 楊義臣 衛玄 劉權	Fan Zigai	
Volume 64	列傳第29 李圓通 陳茂 張定和 張奫 麥鐵杖 沈光 來護兒 魚俱羅 陳稜 王辯	Lai Hu'er	
Volume 65	列傳第30 周羅睺 周法尚 李景 慕容三藏 薛世雄 王仁恭 權武 吐萬緒 董純 趙才		
Volume 66	列傳第31 李諤 鮑宏 裴政 柳庄 源師 郎茂 高構 張虔威 榮毗 陸知命 房彥謙		
Volume 67	列傳第32 虞世基 裴蘊 裴矩	Yu Shiji; Pei Yun; Pei Ju	
Volume 68	列傳第33 宇文愷 閻毗 何稠	Yuwen Kai	
Volume 69	列傳第34 王劭 袁充	Wang Shao; Yuan Chong	
Volume 70	列傳第35 楊玄感 李子雄 趙元淑 斛斯政 劉元進 李密 裴仁基	Yang Xuangan; Li Zixiong; Li Mi; Pei Renji	
Volume 71	列傳第36 誠節	Sincere Men	
Volume 72	列傳第37 孝義	Filial Piety	
Volume 73	列傳第38 循吏	Upright Officials	
Volume 74	列傳第39 酷吏	Cruel Officials	
Volume 75	列傳第40 儒林	Confucian Scholars	
Volume 76	列傳第41 文學	Literature	
Volume 77	列傳第42 隱逸	Hermits	
Volume 78	列傳第43 藝術	Artists	
Volume 79	列傳第44 外戚	Imperial Affines	
Volume 80	列傳第45 列女	Exemplary Women	
Volume 81	列傳第46 東夷	The Dongyi	
Volume 82	列傳第47 南蠻	The Nanman	
Volume 83	列傳第48 西域	The Western Regions	
Volume 84	列傳第49 北狄	The Beidi	
Volume 85	列傳第50 宇文化及 宇文智及 司馬德戡 裴虔通 王充 段達	Yuwen Huaji; Yuwen Zhiji; Wang Shichong	
