= Li Delin =

Chinese historian (532–591)

Li Delin (李德林), courtesy name Gongfu (公輔) (531? - 591?), formally either Duke Wen of Anping (安平文公) (according to the Book of Sui) or Viscount Wen of Cheng'an (成安文子) (according to the Zizhi Tongjian), was an official of the Chinese Northern Qi, Northern Zhou, and Sui dynasties.

He was a prolific writer whose writing ability was greatly praised by his contemporaries and the emperors that he served under. He began the compilation of the Book of Northern Qi, a work that he was never able to complete, but his son Li Baiyao later completed the work.

== Background ==
The exact year of Li Delin's birth is not known, but in all likelihood, he was born during the 530s, perhaps 531, around the time when Northern Wei was divided into Eastern Wei and Western Wei. His grandfather Li Shou (李壽) was a minor provincial official, but his father Li Jingzu (李敬族) was more prominent, serving as both an official and a general during the reign of Emperor Xiaojing of Eastern Wei.

Li Delin was said to be highly intelligent from his childhood, and even before he turned 10 he was able to quickly memorize and recite the lengthy poem Shudu Fu (蜀都賦) by Zuo Si (左思), impressing the high-level official Gao Longzhi (高隆之). By age 14, his writing ability already impressed the historian and official Wei Shou. When he was 15, Li Jingzu died, and Li Delin took his father's casket back to his ancestral commandery Boling (博陵, roughly modern Hengshui, Hebei) for burial. Because his mother Lady Zhao was often ill, he declined offers of governmental posts and remained at Boling to care for his mother, until his mother eventually grew better in her physical condition.

== During Northern Qi ==
Sometime before 557, Gao Jie (高湝) the Prince of Rencheng, the governor of Ding Province (定州, roughly modern Baoding, Hebei) and brother to Emperor Wenxuan of the newly established Northern Qi (Eastern Wei's successor state), impressed with Li Delin's talent, invited Li to his mansion and treated him as a friend, not as a subordinate. In 557, Gao Jie, believing that Li's talent should be employed by the imperial administration, recommended him. The prime minister Yang Yin made Li a low-level official, but in a post where Li felt that his talent was not being used properly, so eventually Li resigned (with the excuse that he was ill) and returned to Boling. He turned to imperial government after Emperor Wenxuan's death in 559, and gradually rose in prominence during the succeeding reigns of Emperor Wenxuan's son Emperor Fei and Emperor Wenxuan's brothers Emperor Xiaozhao and Emperor Wucheng. In 573, when Emperor Wucheng's son and successor Gao Wei, who had a love for literature, established Wenlin Hall (文林館) to retain officials with literary talent, he made Li and Yan Zitui (顏子推) co-directors. Meanwhile, Li was responsible for drafting imperial edicts, and his literary abilities became well known.

== During Northern Zhou ==
In 577, Northern Qi was conquered by rival Northern Zhou (Western Wei's successor state). Emperor Wu of Northern Zhou, who had previously already been impressed by the edicts that Li Delin drafted for Northern Qi's emperors, made the comment, "I have long heard of Li Delin, and when I read the edicts that he wrote for Qi, I believed him to be a heavenly man. I did not know then that one day I can have him draft my own documents." Li thereafter served in Northern Zhou's imperial government, although not of high rank. During the time of the reign of Emperor Wu's grandson Emperor Jing (579–581), while Emperor Wu's son Emperor Xuan still retained imperial powers as retired emperor, Li was created the Baron of Cheng'an.

In 580, Emperor Xuan died, and his father-in-law Yang Jian seized power as regent. He invited Li to serve as his assistant, and Li pledged loyalty to him. It was at Li's suggestion that Yang immediately made his intentions to eventually take the throne known by assuming particularly elevated titles while serving as regent. When the general Yuchi Jiong rose against Yang at Yecheng, the former Northern Qi capital, Yang particularly entrusted strategic issues with Li, allowing Li to make much of the military decisions during the campaign, which eventually saw Yang defeating Yuchi to affirm his hold on power.

== During the Sui dynasty ==
In spring 581, Yang Jian had Emperor Jing yield the throne to him, ending Northern Zhou and establishing the Sui dynasty as Emperor Wen. Emperor Wen reorganized his government into five main branches, and he made Li Delin be the deputy head of the legislative branch Neishi Sheng (內史省), under the official Yu Qingze (虞慶則). Yu subsequently recommended to Emperor Wen that the members of Northern Zhou's imperial Yuwen clan be massacred—a suggestion that the other chief advisors to Emperor Wen, Gao Jiong and Yang Hui (楊惠) disagreed with but did not dare to openly oppose. Only Li openly opposed it, but Emperor Wen responded, "You are only a scholar, and you have no qualifications in this matter." Emperor Wen subsequently did slaughter members of the Yuwen clan, and after this incident, he never again promoted Li—and it did not help that Li, who was proud of his own abilities, generally had poor relations with other high-level officials. Li's title, however, was upgraded from baron to viscount. Li had a particularly adversarial relationship with Su Wei, over Su's constant desire to revise the laws that Li drafted along with Yu Yi (于翼) and Gao in 581 and Li's opposition to Su's proposal to create the office of township mayors with authorities over 500 households, on the grounds that it would be difficult to find enough men capable of governing 500 household units. In this conflict, Su, supported by Gao, was largely able to have his opinions adopted by Emperor Wen, over Li's.

In winter 587, when Emperor Wen visited Tong Province (同州, roughly Weinan, Shaanxi), Li initially did not follow him on account of illness. However, Emperor Wen had him summoned from the capital Chang'an to plan together the invasion of rival Chen dynasty, making the promise to Li, "On the day that Chen is conquered, I will use seven kinds of jewels to decorate you, so that no one east of the Qinling Mountains would be more honored than you would be." When Emperor Wen subsequently launched the invasion in 588, he often had Gao, who was the chief strategist for the campaign, consult Li on strategies. Once Chen was conquered in 589, Emperor Wen initially issued an edict awarding Li a large cache of silk and creating him a duke, but Gao, arguing that doing so would make field generals angry (and because he was jealous of Li's abilities), persuaded Emperor Wen to withdraw the edict.

By 590, Emperor Wen and Su's conflicts with Li had come to the foreground, over several matters. First, when Yuchi Jiong was defeated, at Li's request, Emperor Wen awarded an inn owned by the former Northern Qi official Gao Anagong, who had joined Yuchi's effort, as his reward. Emperor Wen later found out that Gao had himself forcibly seized the land on which the inn sat from the farmers, and Su took the opportunity to accuse Li of being complicit in Gao's seizure. Second, when Yu, after realizing the problems created by township mayors, suggested that the mayoral posts be abolished, Li, while initially opposing the proposal, opposed its abolition, reasoning that laws should not be changed so quickly using language that caused Emperor Wen to believe that Li was comparing him to Wang Mang. Third, Li had previously falsely stated his father Li Jingzu to have been a far higher-ranked official (fourth rank, second class) than actually was the case (ninth rank, first class), in order to obtain posthumous honors for Li Jingzu. Emperor Wen, citing these issues, removed Li from his post and made him the governor of Hu Province (湖州, roughly modern Huzhou, Zhejiang). Li was later moved to Huai Province (懷州, roughly modern Jiaozuo, Henan) and died as its governor, at age 60, probably in 591. Emperor Wen, apparently remembering his contributions, buried him with honor. His son Li Baiyao later served as an official for Sui and its successor state Tang dynasty, and completed Northern Qi's history, the Book of Northern Qi, which Li Delin began but did not complete.
