= Yang Liang =

7th-century Sui dynasty prince

Yang Liang (楊諒) (fl.570s – 604) – courtesy name Dezhang (德章), alternative name Jie (傑), nickname Yiqian (益錢) – was an imperial prince of the Chinese Sui dynasty. He was a son of Emperor Wen and his powerful wife Empress Dugu, who, during his father's reign, controlled the region north of the Yellow River. After his father's death in 604, he rose against his brother Emperor Yang but was soon defeated by Emperor Yang's general Yang Su and forced to surrender. He was reduced to commoner rank and imprisoned for the rest of his life.

== Background ==
It is not known exactly when Yang Liang was born, but it is known that he was the youngest of the five sons of Yang Jian and Yang Jian's wife Dugu Qieluo. As the third of his older brothers, Yang Jun, was born in 571 (the fourth, Yang Xiu, similarly has an unknown birth year) and he was already born at least by the time that Yang Jian seized the throne from Emperor Jing of Northern Zhou, ending Northern Zhou and establishing the Sui dynasty as Emperor Wen in March 581, he would have been born sometime between 573 and 580. In 581, after Emperor Wen took the throne, he created his sons imperial princes, and Yang Liang was created the Prince of Han.

== During Emperor Wen's reign ==
Yang Liang did not participate in the campaign that destroyed rival Chen dynasty in 589 and unified China (in which his older brothers Yang Guang the Prince of Jin and Yang Jun the Prince of Qin participated), suggesting that he was not yet old enough by that point. In 592, he was made the governor of the capital province Yong Province (雍州, roughly modern Xi'an, Shaanxi). In 597, he was made the commandant at Bing Province (并州, roughly modern Taiyuan, Shanxi), and was in charge of the 52 provinces north of the Yellow River. In 598, when Emperor Wen attacked Goguryeo, Yang Liang served as co-commander of the operation (along with the general Wang Shiji (王世積)). The Sui forces later withdrew, Goguryeo then sued for peace. (During the campaign, the general Gao Jiong served as Yang Liang's lieutenant, and, due to his senior status, often disobeyed the young Yang Liang, causing Yang Liang to be so displeased that he complained to his mother Empress Dugu, further straining the relationship between Empress Dugu and Gao over Gao's refusal to endorse Yang Guang, her favorite son, as crown prince, and in 599, at Empress Dugu's urging, Emperor Wen removed Gao from his post.)

In 599, when Sui forces attacked Tujue's Dulan Khan, Ashina Yongyulü, Yang Liang was nominally the overall commander of the operations, but did not go to the front. In summer 600, when Dulan Khan's successor Bujia Khan Ashina Dianjue (阿史那玷厥), who was a rival claimant to the Tujue throne to the Sui-supported Qimin Khan Ashina Rangan, attacked Sui, Yang Liang was one of the four commanders (along with his brother Yang Guang and the generals Yang Su the Duke of Yue and Shi Wansui (史萬歲) the Duke of Taiping) sent by Emperor Wen to engage Bujia Khan, and they defeated him, although Yang Liang's contribution to the campaign was unclear.

Meanwhile, Emperor Wen much favored Yang Liang, but Yang Liang was becoming ambitious and troubled by the removal of his oldest brother, Yang Yong, as crown prince in 600. (Yang Guang replaced Yang Yong as crown prince.) He therefore persuaded Emperor Wen that his headquarters at Taiyuan was the key to the defense against Tujue, so Emperor Wen permitted him to produce weapons and build up Taiyuan's defenses. Two of his trusted generals, Wang Kui (王頍) and Xiao Mohe, both of whom believed that they should have been given greater responsibility by Emperor Wen, also encouraged him to eventually consider rebelling. Yang Liang was further troubled after another brother, Yang Xiu the Prince of Shu, was deposed over charges of wastefulness in 602. (Part of the charges against Yang Xiu, which appeared to have been manufactured by Yang Guang, was that Yang Xiu secretly cursed Emperor Wen and Yang Liang, but there was no evidence indicating that Yang Xiu actually did so or that Yang Liang believed Yang Xiu did or resented Yang Xiu over it.)

== Rebellion against Emperor Yang ==
In 604, Yang Guang became emperor (as Emperor Yang) after Emperor Wen's death. (Most traditional historians believe that Emperor Wen was murdered at Yang Guang's order, although they admit a lack of direct evidence.) Emperor Yang, apprehensive of Yang Liang's intentions, did not initially announce Emperor Wen's death, and sent the general Qutu Tong (屈突通) to Taiyuan to summon Yang Liang to the capital Daxing, using an edict in Emperor Wen's name. However, Yang Liang figured out that the edict was a forgery, and declared a rebellion, supported by governors of 19 provinces. However, even though Wang Kui pointed out to him that he needed to make a quick selection between the strategies of attacking Daxing quickly (in which case he needed to advance as fast as he could) or to try to hold his territory north of the Yellow River (in which case he needed to make certain that the generals in charge of his operations were largely people from the old territory of Northern Qi), Yang Liang could not decide which set of strategies to use, and therefore used a mixed approach. As his rationale for rebelling, he declared that Yang Su had committed treason. (As the modern historian Bo Yang pointed out, falsely accusing Yang Su of treason was an unconvincing declaration. Bo suggested that even if Yang Liang had not known about Yang Guang's involvement in Emperor Wen's death by that point, he still nevertheless should have accused Yang Guang of patricide.)

Yang Liang made initial gains, and his forces, commanded by Pei Wen'an (裴文安), quickly captured the strategically important Pu Province (蒲州, roughly modern Yuncheng, Shanxi) and were poised to cross the Yellow River to attack the capital region. For reasons unclear then, Yang Liang changed his mind and destroyed the bridge over the Yellow River, stalling his own advances, although he soon advanced south from Taiyuan himself to again make another offensive. Soon, Yang Su, loyal to Emperor Yang, advanced north and met Yang Liang's forces. Against Wang's suggestion that he should engage Yang Su quickly, Yang Liang withdrew to Qingyuan (清源, near Taiyuan), thus losing initiative. Yang Su defeated him and captured Xiao Mohe, forcing him to retreat to Taiyuan, where Yang Su put him under siege. Wang Kui committed suicide. Eventually, Yang Liang surrendered. Even though officials largely suggested that Yang Liang should be executed, Emperor Yang did not do so, but reduced him to commoner rank and put him under imprisonment. He died in imprisonment, and although it was unclear the year he died, it appeared to be not long after his capture. His son Yang Hao (楊顥, different person than Yang Jun's son who later was declared emperor) was also imprisoned, and when Emperor Yang was assassinated by the general Yuwen Huaji in 618, Yang Hao was also killed.

== Popular culture ==
- Portrayed by Jung Wook in 2006–2007 SBS TV series Yeon Gaesomun.

== See also ==
- Goguryeo–Sui Wars
