= Li Baiyao =

Chinese historian

Li Baiyao (simplified Chinese: 李百药; traditional Chinese: 李百藥) (564–647), courtesy name Zhonggui (重規), formally Viscount Kang of Anping (安平康子), was a Chinese historian and an official during the Chinese Sui dynasty and Tang dynasties. He was honored for his literary abilities, and he was known for completing the official history of Northern Qi, the Book of Northern Qi, which his father Li Delin had started.
