= Yang Xiu (Sui dynasty) =

Yang Xiu (楊秀) (570s – c.12 April 618) was an imperial prince of the Sui dynasty. He was a son of Emperor Wen and his powerful wife Empress Dugu, and during most of his father's reign was given great control over the modern Sichuan and Chongqing region. In 602, after accusations were made that Yang Xiu was abusing his power, Emperor Wen removed him from power and reduced him to commoner rank. He was subsequently held under house arrest for the rest of Emperor Wen's reign and the reign of his brother Emperor Yang. In April 618, after the general Yuwen Huaji killed Emperor Yang, he and his co-conspirators briefly considered declaring Yang Xiu emperor, but ultimately decided not to, and instead executed Yang Xiu and his sons.

== Family ==
Parents

- Father: Emperor Wen of Sui (隋文帝; 21 July 541 – 13 August 604)
- Mother: Empress Wenxian, of the Henan Dugu clan (文獻皇后 河南獨孤氏; 544–602)

Consort and their respective issue(s):

- Princess Consort Shu, of the Zhangsun clan of Henan (楊王妃 河南長孫氏), daughter of Zhangsun Lan (長孫覽)
- Beauty, of the Dong clan ( 美人董氏)
- Unknown:
  - Seven sons (all were executed by Yuwen Huaji)

== Background ==
It is not known exactly when Yang Xiu was born, but it is known that he was the fourth of the five sons of Yang Jian and Yang Jian's wife Dugu Qieluo. As the third of his older brothers, Yang Jun, was born in 571 (his younger brother, Yang Liang, similarly has an unknown birth year) and he was already born at least by the time that Yang Jian seized the throne from Emperor Jing of Northern Zhou, ending Northern Zhou and establishing the Sui dynasty as Emperor Wen in March 581, he would have been born sometime between 572 and 579. On 15 March 581, Emperor Wen appointed his sons as imperial princes, and Yang Xiu was appointed the Prince of Yue.

== During Emperor Wen's reign ==
In winter 581, the official Xuan Min (宣敏), after returning from an inspection of the Shu region (modern Chongqing and Sichuan), suggested that Emperor Wen should make the region the fief for one of his sons, pointing out the region's wealth and strategic importance and that Northern Zhou had fallen because its imperial princes lacked the power to defend the state. Emperor Wen liked the proposal, and so changed Yang Xiu's title to Prince of Shu and made him the commandant of Yi Prefecture (roughly modern Chengdu, Sichuan), in charge of the 24 surrounding prefectures. Emperor Wen made the official Yuan Yan (元巖) Yang Xiu's chief of staff, and it was said that Yuan served Yang Xiu capably, keeping his behavior proper. Yang Xiu did not participate in the campaign against the Chen dynasty in 589 that destroyed Chen and unified China, in which his older brothers Yang Guang the Prince of Jin and Yang Jun the Prince of Qin participated; instead, the soldiers from his region were commanded by Yang Su, implying that Yang Xiu might not be old enough to command troops personally by this point.

In 592, Yang Xiu appeared to be briefly recalled to the capital Daxing to serve as the head of the legislative branch of government, the Neishi Sheng (內史省), when Emperor Wen put him and the official Yu Qingze (虞慶則) in charge of investigating claims that the deputy head of the executive branch, the Shangshu Sheng (尚書省), Su Wei, had been engaging in factionalism. Yang Xiu and Yu found Su to be guilty, and Emperor Wen stripped Su of his titles. It appears that briefly thereafter, Yang Xiu returned to Yi Prefecture.

In 598, Yang Xiu submitted an accusation that the general Shi Wansui (史萬歲) had received bribes from the chief of the Nanning Tribe (南寧夷), Cuan Wan (爨翫), in 597, to permit Cuan, after surrendering to Shi after a revolt, not be taken to Daxing, allowing Cuan to rebel again in 598. Emperor Wen nearly executed Shi over the accusation, but eventually spared him and reduced him to commoner rank.

Over the years, as Yang Xiu became more and more accustomed to ruling over the region and grew arrogant and wasteful beyond the appropriate levels for an imperial prince. After Yuan Yan died in 593, without anyone to check his behavior, he made an armillary sphere – an item that only an emperor would be permitted to have. He also seized many men of the Liao tribe and castrated them to serve as his eunuchs and used vehicles and decorations only appropriate for an emperor. Emperor Wen often told Empress Dugu, "Yang Xiu will surely suffer a violent end. While I do not need to worry while I am alive, when his brother becomes emperor, he will surely revolt." In one of the campaigns against Cuan Wan's forces, Yang Xiu sent his jester Wan Zhiguang (萬智光) to serve as the assistant to the general Yang Wutong (楊武通). Emperor Wen, finding this out and believing this act to be inappropriate, began to divide the forces under Yang Xiu's command.

In 600, Yang Xiu's eldest brother Yang Yong the Crown Prince, over false accusations made by Yang Guang and Yang Guang's ally Yang Su, was deposed, and Yang Guang replaced Yang Yong as crown prince. Yang Xiu was displeased over the development, and Yang Guang was worried that Yang Xiu would make trouble for him. He instructed Yang Su to collect evidence of Yang Xiu's improper behavior and submit it to Emperor Wen. In fall 602, Emperor Wen summoned Yang Xiu back to the capital, sending the general Dugu Jie (獨孤楷) to replace him. Yang Xiu considered refusing to return to Daxing, but decided not to resist after being advised by Yuan Shimin (源師民) otherwise. However, even after Dugu Jie arrived at Yi Province, Yang Xiu had not gotten underway, and it took further urging by Dugu Jie for him to actually depart. Yang Xiu, after leaving Yi Province, considered returning and attacking Dugu Jie, but Dugu Jie, who had taken precautions, had his army in a state of high alert, and therefore Yang Xiu gave up on the idea. While Yang Xiu was still en route back to Chang'an, his mother Empress Dugu died.

When Yang Xiu arrived at Chang'an some three months after his departure from Yi Province, Emperor Wen refused to say anything to him while meeting him. Emperor Wen then sent messengers to severely rebuke him, and Yang Xiu begged for forgiveness. Yang Guang and the other imperial princes publicly begged for forgiveness on Yang Xiu's account as well, but Yang Guang secretly made two dolls with the names of Emperor Wen and Yang Liang the Prince of Han and curses against them and buried the dolls, and then had Yang Su dig them out and submit the dolls to Emperor Wen, along with evidence that Yang Xiu had made plans to attack the capital at some point. Around the new year 603, Emperor Wen reduced Yang Xiu to commoner rank and put him under house arrest within the Bureau of Eunuchs, not permitting him to meet with his wife and children. Yang Xiu submitted a petition for forgiveness, particularly asking to again see his favorite son, whose nickname was Guazi (瓜子). Further incensed by the petition, Emperor Wen issued an edict accusing Yang Xiu of 10 crimes, particularly stating, "I do not know what kind of relatives 'Yang Jian' and 'Yang Liang' are to you." Yang Su also took this opportunity to falsely accuse certain political enemies to be Yang Xiu's associates and had them banished.

== During Emperor Yang's reign ==
In 604, Emperor Wen died—a death that traditional historians commonly believed to be a murder ordered by Yang Guang, even though those historians admit that they had no direct evidence of it. Yang Guang took the throne as Emperor Yang. He continued to hold Yang Xiu under house arrest, and whenever he took tours of the country (of which he had 11 during his reign), he usually took Yang Xiu with him. In April 618, while Emperor Yang was at Jiangdu (江都, in modern Yangzhou, Jiangsu), Emperor Yang was killed in a coup led by the general Yuwen Huaji. Yuwen and his co-conspirators briefly considered declaring Yang Xiu emperor, but ultimately decided not to do so, and instead executed Yang Xiu and his seven sons.
