= Gao Jiong =

6th-century official and general in Sui China

Gāo Jiǒng (simplified Chinese: 高颎; traditional Chinese: 高熲) (died August 27, 607), courtesy name Zhaoxuan (昭玄), alternative name Min (敏))) known during the Northern Zhou period by the Xianbei name Dugu Jiong (独孤颎/獨孤熲), was a Chinese military general and politician of the Chinese Sui dynasty. He was a key advisor to Emperor Wen of Sui and instrumental in the campaign against the rival Chen dynasty, allowing Sui to destroy Chen in 589 and reunify China. In 607, he offended Emperor Wen's son Emperor Yang of Sui (Yang Guang) by criticizing Emperor Yang's large rewards to Tujue's submissive Qimin Khan and was executed by Emperor Yang. (Note: Some traditional historians believed that Emperor Yang was looking for an excuse to execute him after he had, against his orders, executed the Chen emperor Chen Shubao's concubine Consort Zhang Lihua, whom Emperor Yang, then an imperial prince, might have wanted to seize as a concubine himself.)

Quoting Arthur Wright, author Hengy Chye Kiang calls Gao Jiong "'a man of practical statecraft" recalling the great Legalist statesmen. His influence saw the replacement of Confucians with officials of "Legalist" outlook favouring centralization.

== Background ==
It is not known when Gao Jiong was born. His father Gao Bin (高宾/高賓) was an official of Eastern Wei who, in 540, fearful of false accusations against him, fled to Western Wei. Gao Bin served on the staff of the Xianbei general Dugu Xin, and on the orders of Western Wei's paramount general Yuwen Tai in 554, changed his family name to Dugu as well. Because of this connection, after Dugu Xin was forced to commit suicide in 557 after the founding of Western Wei's successor state Northern Zhou, Dugu Xin's daughter Dugu Qieluo often visited Gao Bin's home. Gao Bin eventually served as a provincial governor and died during such a posting.

Gao Jiong was himself skilled in history and rhetoric while young. When he was 16, Yuwen Xian the Prince of Qi made Gao Jiong a member of his staff. He inherited the title of Count of Wuyang that had been created for his father. He apparently served under Yuwen Xian when Yuwen Xian was a major general in the campaign of his brother Emperor Wu of Northern Zhou in destroying rival Northern Qi, (Eastern Wei's successor state) and was promoted to a mid-level post in the imperial government.

In 580, after the death of Emperor Wu's son Emperor Xuan, Emperor Xuan's father-in-law Yang Jian (Dugu Qieluo's husband) seized power as regent over Emperor Xuan's son Emperor Jing (by Emperor Xuan's concubine Zhu Manyue). Yang Jian, knowing that Gao was intelligent and full of strategies, sent his associate Yang Hui the Duke of Yu to request that Gao join his staff. Gao, seeing that Yang had great ambitions, responded, "I am willing to be driven by him. Even if the Duke's ambitions could not be carried out, I am willing to have my clan slaughtered over this." He therefore agreed to serve as Yang's secretary. When the general and prefect Yuchi Jiong, suspicious of Yang's intentions, rebelled at Xiang Province (相州, roughly modern Handan, Hebei), Yang needed someone to oversee the operations against Yuchi, but his associates Cui Zhongfang (崔仲方), Liu Fang (劉昉), and Zheng Yi (鄭譯) each declined. Gao volunteered, and he not oversaw the operations but also personally defeated Yuchi's son Yuchi Chun (尉遲淳). After the major general Wei Xiaokuan defeated Yuchi Jiong and forced Yuchi Jiong to commit suicide, Gao Jiong was created the Duke of Yi'ning. (As Yang soon declared that Yuwen Tai's system or decree of requiring Chinese officials and generals to change their names to Xianbei should be rescinded, Gao after this point did not use the family name Dugu any more.)

== During Emperor Wen's reign ==
In 581, Yang Jian had Emperor Jing yield the throne to him, ending Northern Zhou and establishing the Sui dynasty as its Emperor Wen. He reorganized his government into five major bureaus, and Gao served as both the head of the examination bureau (門下省, Menxia Sheng) and the co-head of the executive bureau (尚書省, Shangshu Sheng) -- effectively serving as co-prime minister. He was created the Duke of Bohai, and few officials could rival him in terms of Emperor Wen's trust, shown by Gao's appointment as one of the officials in charge of the hengy legal reforms enacted in the Kaihuang Code. Emperor Wen often referred to him honorifically as simply "Mr. Dugu" (using his old Xianbei name) without mentioning his given name. Gao recommended Su Wei to Emperor Wen, and Emperor Wen trusted Su as well, eventually promoting Su to be co-prime minister. Whenever other officials made accusations against Gao, Emperor Wen deposed those officials. He also gave a daughter of his son and crown prince Yang Yong to Gao's son Gao Biaoren (高表仁) in marriage.

In 582, Emperor Wen had Gao oversee an operation against the rival Chen dynasty, but when Emperor Xuan of Chen died in early 582, Gao suggested that it was improper to attack a state that had just lost its emperor, and Emperor Wen agreed and withdrew the troops. Later in 582, it was after consulting Gao and Su that Emperor Wen, who had felt that the city of Chang'an, his capital, was too small, constructed a new capital nearby named Daxing (大興), where he moved the capital in 583.

In fall 583, Emperor Wen sent Gao and Yu Qingze (虞慶則) to attack Tujue.

In 587, while Sui's vassal Emperor Jing of Western Liang was at Daxing, Emperor Jing's uncle Xiao Yan (蕭巖) and brother Xiao Huan (蕭瓛), in charge of his capital Jiangling, feared that the Sui general Cui Hongdu (崔弘度) was going attack, and therefore took the people of Jiangling and surrendered to the Chen general Chen Huiji (陳慧紀, the cousin of Chen's emperor Chen Shubao). In response, Emperor Wen abolished Western Liang and took its territory under direct control. He sent Gao to Jiangling to comfort the people of the region. Meanwhile, when Emperor Wen asked Gao for tactics in preparing to conquer Chen, Gao suggested harassing Chen's border regions in two ways: sending troops on exercise without actually attacking, to cause Chen's farmers to be on alert and unable to farm and causing Chen's guards to be down when an actual attack would come; and to send spies to burn Chen's border farmlands. Emperor Wen agreed, and these tactics helped damage Chen's resistance capabilities.

In winter 588, Emperor Wen declared the campaign against Chen. He made general Yang Su and his sons Yang Guang the Prince of Jin and Yang Jun the Prince of Qin the commanders of the three main prongs of the operation, with Yang Guang in overall command. Gao served as Yang Guang's deputy and was responsible for the strategies used in the campaign. When Chen's capital Jiankang fell in spring 589 and the emperor Chen Shubao was captured, Yang Guang ordered that Chen Shubao's concubine Consort Zhang Lihua be spared—perhaps because he wanted to take Consort Zhang as his own concubine. Instead, Gao, comparing Consort Zhang to Daji—the wicked wife of King Zhou of Shang, last king of Shang dynasty —beheaded her. Yang Guang thereafter resented Gao greatly, stating sarcastically, "It has been said, 'You should repay every good deed done to you.' I will repay Duke Gao later." Gao was responsible for collecting Chen's imperial stores, and was said to be exceedingly scrupulous at it, taking nothing for himself. For Gao's contributions, Emperor Wen promoted him to the greater title of Duke of Qi and awarded him with much silk. When Emperor Wen told him and the general Heruo Bi (賀若弼) to compare their contributions, Gao declined, stating that Heruo fought on the battlefield while he was merely serving as a civilian, and could not compare himself to Heruo. Emperor Wen was impressed and honored Gao even more. However, when Emperor Wen wanted to create the official Li Delin a duke as well for his contributions, as Gao had consulted Li during the campaign, Gao persuaded Emperor Wen not to, apparently out of jealousy for Li.

In 592, Su was removed from his post as co-prime minister, and Yang Su replaced Su. It was commented by traditional historians that Yang Su was more talented and had more foresight than Gao, but that he was not as fairminded or well-behaved as Gao.

In 598, angry that Ying Province (營州, roughly modern Chaoyang, Liaoning) had been attacked by Goguryeo, Emperor Wen send his son Yang Liang and the general Wang Shiji (王世積) to attack Goguryeo—a campaign that Gao tried to dissuade Emperor Wen from but Emperor Wen launched anyway, and in fact forced Gao to serve as Yang Liang's deputy. Due to Yang Liang's young age, Gao was actually in charge of the operation, which ended in failure due to inadequate food supplies due to drought, as well as a storm destroying a large part of the fleet commanded by the former Chen general Zhou Luohou (周羅睺). Yang Liang, disgruntled at how Gao gave him little actual authority on the campaign and frequently disobeyed him, complained to Empress Dugu that he was fortunate to not have been killed by Gao, and this angered Emperor Wen as well.

Meanwhile, the relationships between Gao and the imperial couple were breaking down for other reasons as well. Earlier, there had been a confrontation between Emperor Wen and Empress Dugu over Emperor Wen's sexual relationship with Yuchi Jiong's granddaughter (who had become a palace servant) and Empress Dugu's subsequent killing of Lady Yuchi. Emperor Wen was so angry that he rode away from the palace, requiring Gao and Yang Su to track him down. At Gao and Yang Su's urging, Emperor Wen and Empress Dugu reconciled over a feast that Gao and Yang Su hosted. However, while persuading Emperor Wen to return to the palace, Gao referred to Empress Dugu as "a woman," which, when she found out, she was displeased with. Further, by this point, Yang Yong had lost Emperor Wen and Empress Dugu's favor, over his wastefulness (which displeased Emperor Wen) and having many concubines (which displeased Empress Dugu). Gao, who had also drawn Empress Dugu's ire for having a favorite concubine, thereafter came under suspicion by Emperor Wen and Empress Dugu of being overly supportive of Yang Yong, as he rejected outright the possibility that Yang Yong should be displaced by Yang Guang. In 599, when Emperor Wen sent Gao, Yang Su, and Yan Rong (燕榮) against Tujue's Dulan Khan Ashina Yongyulü, Gao, while on the campaign, requested additional troops, leading to suspicion by Emperor Wen that he was planning a rebellion, but Gao soon returned from the campaign, temporary assuaging Emperor Wen's fears.

However, later in 599, after Wang Shiji was executed over suspicions of treason, accusations arose during the investigation of Wang's case that he had heard many palace secrets from Gao. Thereafter, Gao and two other high level officials, Yuan Min (元旻) and Yuan Zhou (元冑), were accused of accepting bribes from Wang, and Yuan Min and Yuan Zhou were removed from their posts. When several other officials, including Heruo, Yuwen Bi (宇文弼), Xue Zhou (薛冑), Hulü Xiaoqing (斛律孝卿), and Liu Shu (柳述), tried to speak on Gao's behalf, Emperor Wen was so angry at them that he briefly threw them all into jail. Soon, Gao was found guilty and removed from his governmental posts, but allowed to keep his title of Duke of Qi. Soon thereafter, however, Gao was accused of comparing himself to Sima Yi, and was reduced to commoner rank. He thereafter was powerless to prevent Yang Yong's removal and replacement by Yang Guang in 600.

== During Emperor Yang's reign ==
Gao Jiong's activities for the next several years were not clear. In 604, Emperor Wen died—a death that most traditional historians, while admitting a lack of direct evidence, believed to be a murder ordered by Yang Guang—and Yang Guang took the throne as Emperor Yang. Sometime after Emperor Yang took the throne, he made Gao the minister of ceremonies. When Emperor Yang ordered, in 606, that the former palace musicians from Northern Qi and Northern Zhou be regathered (Emperor Wen, who disfavored music, had disbanded the palace music corps), Gao opposed, without effect. In 607, when Emperor Yang gave great rewards to Tujue's submissive Qimin Khan Ashina Rangan, Gao again opposed, with no effect. It was said that Gao made several comments critical of Emperor Yang's policies, including a comment to his secretary Li Yi (李懿), "Zhou's Emperor Tianyuan [i.e., Emperor Xuan] destroyed his dynasty over his favor for dances, music, and crafts. The example of his spilled wagon is just in the short past, and how is it that it is being repeated?" He told He Chou (何稠), the minister of palace storage, as to Ashina Rangan, "This barbarian has become knowledgeable about China's strength and geographical features, and I fear that he will become a danger later." He also spoke to Yang Xiong (楊雄) the Prince of Guan (Emperor Yang's cousin) and said, "Recently, the government's laws are not being enforced." These comments were reported to Emperor Yang, along with similar comments made by Yuwen Bi and Heruo Bi. In summer 607, Emperor Yang had Gao, Yuwen, and Heruo all beheaded, and Gao's sons were exiled to the border provinces. Some traditional historians, however, attribute Gao's death to his earlier killing of Consort Zhang.

The Book of Sui commented, about Gao:

Gao Jiong was talented in both civilian and military matters and highly observant. Since he received the emperor's confidence, he expended his faithful service and contributed earnestly. He recommended talented people, and he saw saving the world as his responsibility. Su Wei, Yang Su, Heruo Bi, and Han Qinhu [(韓擒虎, another general)] were all brought into the government by Gao, and the officials who contributed because of his recommendations were innumerable. Gao was in power for almost 20 years, and both officials and the people praised and respected him, with no objections. That the empire could become rich and powerful was due to Gao. When he was executed, everyone mourned for him.

== Notes and references ==
- Book of Sui, vol. 41.
- History of Northern Dynasties, vol. 72.
- Zizhi Tongjian, vols. 174, 175, 176, 177, 178, 179, 180.
