= Yang Hao (Sui dynasty) =

Yang Hao 楊浩
- Reign: April 10 618 – 618
- Born: November 22, 586?
- Died: October 23, 618
Full name
- Family name: Yáng (楊); Given name: Hào (浩)
- Dynasty: Sui dynasty

Yang Hao (Chinese: 楊浩; November 22, 586?-October 23, 618), often known by the title of Prince of Qin (秦王), was one of the claimants of the throne of the Chinese Sui dynasty at the dynasty's end.

== Background ==
Yang Hao was a grandson of Sui's founder Emperor Wen. His father Yang Jun was the Prince of Qin. Yang Hao was one of Yang Jun's two sons, and his mother was Yang Jun's wife Princess Cui. In 597, angry and jealous over Yang Jun's favor for his concubines, Princess Cui poisoned melons that he was eating. Yang Jun grew ill, and went back from his defense post at Bing Province (并州, roughly modern Taiyuan, Shanxi) to the capital Chang'an for treatment. After he did so, Princess Cui's poisoning of him was discovered. Emperor Wen ordered that she be divorced and sent back to the household of her brother Cui Hongdu (崔弘度), and then ordered her to commit suicide.

Yang Jun never completely recovered from his illness. He died in 600. Emperor Wen, reasoning that Princess Cui's crime tainted Yang Hao and that his brother Yang Zhan (楊湛) was born of a concubine and therefore unfit to inherit the title, did not allow either to inherit the title of Prince of Qin, and in fact ordered that Yang Jun's staff members serve as his mourners, suggesting that both Yang Hao and Yang Zhan were excluded from the funeral proceedings.

== During Emperor Yang's reign ==
Emperor Wen died in 604, and Yang Hao's uncle Yang Guang took the throne as Emperor Yang. In 606, he created Yang Hao the Prince of Qin and Yang Zhan the Marquess of Jibei. By 613, Yang Hao was serving as the commander of the militia in Heyang Commandery (河陽, roughly modern Jiaozuo, Henan) when the general Yang Xuangan rebelled nearby. Emperor Yang, then at the front of a campaign against Goguryeo, sent the general Yuwen Shu back to Sui territory to attack Yang Xuangan, and Yuwen and Yang Hao exchanged letters, and they further met and joined forces against Yang Xuangan. However, after Yang Xuangan's rebellion was suppressed, Yang Hao was indicted for communicating with imperial officials—an act not allowed for imperial princes—and removed from his post.

In spring 618, with the Sui state engulfed in various rebellions, Yang Hao was with Emperor Yang at Jiangdu (江都, in modern Yangzhou, Jiangsu), when a coup led by the general Yuwen Huaji (Yuwen Shu's son) killed Emperor Yang. The coup leaders also killed many of Emperor Yang's relatives and high-level officials. However, as Yang Hao was friendly with Yuwen Huaji's brother Yuwen Zhiji (宇文智及), Yuwen Zhiji persuaded Yuwen Huaji to spare Yang Hao, and subsequently, Yang Hao was declared emperor by an edict issued in the name of Emperor Yang's wife Empress Xiao, although Yuwen Huaji wielded actual powers, as regent.

== Reign ==
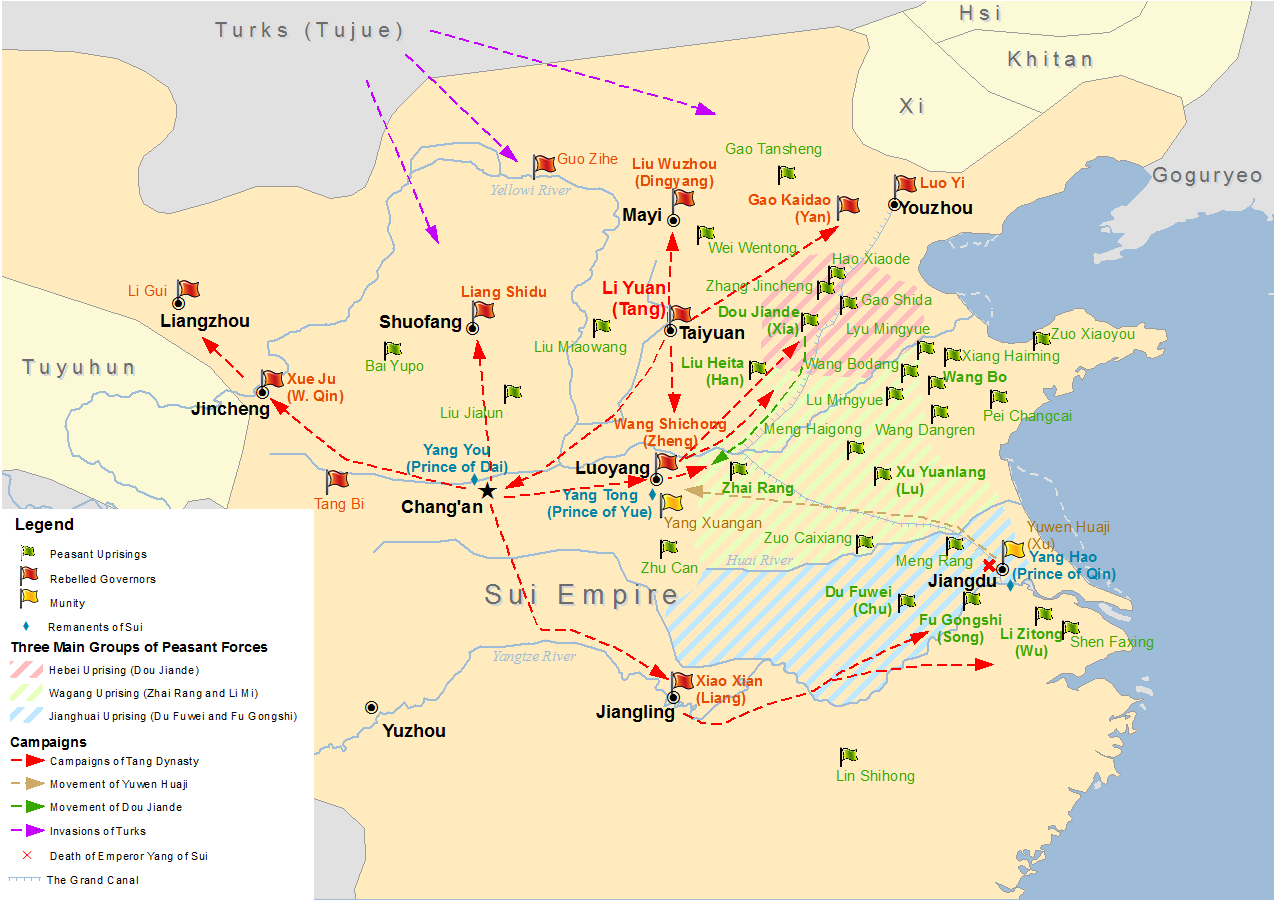
Map showing major uprisings and rebellions in the last years of Sui dynasty. Yang Hao's reign was influenced by Yuwen Huaji.

There was no evidence that suggested that Yuwen Huaji permitted Yang Hao to actually exercise any imperial powers. Yuwen Huaji soon abandoned Jiangdu and led the remaining Sui court and the elite Xiaoguo Army (驍果) north. During the procession, Yang Hao was effectively put under house arrest at the mobile executive bureau (尚書省, Shangshu Sheng), under heavy guard. Edicts were signed by Yang Hao, but he was not even permitted to meet with the officials. Yuwen Huaji soon engaged the rebel leader Li Mi but suffered several defeats against Li and eventually forced to withdraw to Wei (魏縣, in modern Handan, Hebei). As he saw his military power waning, he became depressed. He then resolved to be emperor while he was still alive, and therefore poisoned Yang Hao, declaring himself emperor of a state of Xu.

== Personal information ==
- Father
  - Yang Jun, Prince Xiao of Qin
- Mother
  - Princess Cui (forced to commit suicide 597), Yang Jun's wife, sister of Cui Hongdu (崔弘度)

Chinese royalty
Preceded by Emperor Yang of Sui	Emperor of the Sui dynasty (Xiaoguo Army); 618	Claim extinguished
Preceded by Emperor Yang of Sui	Emperor of China (Xiaoguo Army); 618	Succeeded by Yuwen Huaji (Emperor of Xu)
