= Yang Yong (Sui dynasty) =

Crown Prince of Sui China (d. 604)

Yang Yong (Chinese: 楊勇; died August 604), Xianbei name Xiandifa (睍地伐), also known by his posthumous title of Prince of Fangling (房陵王), was a crown prince of Sui dynasty. He was the oldest son of Emperor Wen and Empress Dugu. He drew ire from his parents for wastefulness (which Emperor Wen disliked) and having many concubines (which Empress Dugu disliked), while his younger brother, Yang Guang, whom Emperor Wen and Empress Dugu thought lacked these faults, was favored by them. In 600, Emperor Wen deposed Yang Yong and replaced him with Yang Guang. Subsequently, after Emperor Wen died on 13 August 604 (a death that most historians, while acknowledging a lack of conclusive evidence, believed to be a murder ordered by Yang Guang), Yang Guang had Yang Yong put to death.

== Background ==
It is not known when Yang Yong was born. He was the oldest son of Yang Jian and his wife Dugu Qieluo, but it is not known whether he was older or younger than his oldest sister, Yang Lihua (who later became empress to Emperor Xuan of Northern Zhou), born in 561. During Northern Zhou, as Yang Jian's father Yang Zhong (楊忠) the Duke of Sui was an accomplished general, Yang Yong received the title of Marquess of Boping. (This implies, but does not conclusively show, that Yang Yong was born before Yang Zhong's death in 568, when Yang Jian inherited the title of Duke of Sui.) Sometime before 580, Yang Jian and Lady Dugu selected the daughter of the official Yuan Xiaoju (元孝矩), a descendant of Northern Wei's imperial house, to be Yang Yong's wife. During this time, Yang Yong served as a low-level official in Northern Zhou's imperial administration.

In 580, after Emperor Xuan's death, Yang Jian seized power as regent over Emperor Xuan's son Emperor Jing (by Emperor Xuan's concubine Zhu Manyue). After defeating the general Yuchi Jiong, who rose against him, he had Yang Yong created the Duke of Changning and the commandant of Luoyang, with authority over all of the old territory of Northern Qi (which Emperor Xuan's father Emperor Wu destroyed in 577. He was, however, soon recalled to the capital Chang'an to serve as the minister of defense.

In spring 581, Yang Jian had Emperor Jing yield the throne to him, ending Northern Zhou and establishing Sui dynasty as its Emperor Wen. Emperor Wen created Yang Yong crown prince.

In the Book of Sui, Yang Yong was described as a studious and handsome gentleman who was known for his gracious demeanour, straightforwardness and generosity, and was respected by many.

== As crown prince ==
=== Early in Emperor Wen's reign ===
While Yang Yong was crown prince, it was clear that Emperor Wen and Empress Dugu favored his younger brother, their second son Yang Guang the Prince of Jin. In summer 581, Yang Yong's chief of staff Lu Ben (盧賁), trying to exploit this situation to gain Yang Yong's favor, tried to get Yang Yong involved in his plot to, jointly with several other officials, take over power from Emperor Wen's favored officials Gao Jiong and Su Wei. The plot was discovered, and Lu Ben and his associates were deposed, but Yang Yong was not punished.

In winter 582, Emperor Wen, anticipating an attack from Tujue during the construction of his new capital Daxing, near Chang'an, had Yang Yong command troops and briefly posted at nearby Xianyang to defend the potential Tujue attack.

In spring 586, the commoner Gao De (高德) submitted a petition to Emperor Wen, suggesting that he pass the throne to Yang Yong and become retired emperor. Emperor Wen rejected the petition, but did not punish Gao. Subsequently, in summer 586, Emperor Wen again had Yang Yong posted to Luoyang, with authority over the surrounding provinces.

In 589, Sui conquered its rival Chen dynasty, unifying China. Yang Yong's brother Yang Guang, as the supreme commander over the entire operation, received many accolades.

=== Late in Emperor Wen's reign ===
Yang Yong was recorded as being lenient, kind, and honest in his nature, making few pretenses, but he favored luxuries, much to the chagrin of Emperor Wen, who favored frugality. Once, when Yang Yong made a highly decorated set of armor, Emperor Wen rebuked him, sending him an undecorated sword that Emperor Wen himself employed, as well as a box of miso, to remind him that prior to becoming crown prince, he had to settle for common items such as those. The relationship between Emperor Wen and Yang Yong was further strained when, at Dongzhi, Yang Yong openly welcomed officials to his palace, which Emperor Wen interpreted as Yang Yong's receiving submission from those officials—an act that Emperor Wen considered inappropriate as Yang Yong, while crown prince, was still an imperial subject.

The relationship between Yang Yong and Empress Dugu also became strained, as Empress Dugu disfavored men who had many concubines (so much so that Emperor Wen did not have many concubines while she was still alive, and might not have had sexual relations even with the few concubines that he had during her lifetime), but Yang Yong, who did not favor his wife Crown Princess Yuan, had many concubines, particularly favoring the beautiful Consort Yun. Crown Princess Yuan, who did not have any sons with Yang Yong, died suddenly in 591, apparently from a heart ailment, but both Emperor Wen and Empress Dugu suspected foul play, and Empress Dugu particularly rebuked him. After Crown Princess Yuan's death, Consort Yun became the effective mistress over the Crown Prince's palace, and she and the other concubines bore Yang Yong 10 sons in total, which made Empress Dugu exceedingly displeased, as she was even more displeased at men having children with their concubines. Yang Guang, who had ambitions of replacing Yang Yong, was meanwhile gaining the favors of both Emperor Wen and Empress Dugu by pretending to be frugal and loving only his wife Princess Xiao, which caused Emperor Wen and Empress Dugu to be further displeased with Yang Yong, by comparison.

By 599, both Emperor Wen and Empress Dugu were considering replacing Yang Yong with Yang Guang. When Empress Dugu tried to see if she could have support in this proposition from Gao Jiong, Gao, whose son Gao Biaoren (高表仁) married Yang Yong's daughter, stated his opposition, and this, coupled with Gao Jiong's own favor for a concubine after his wife's death, eventually caused Emperor Wen and Empress Dugu to deposed Gao Jiong from his influential posts in fall 599.

Meanwhile, Yang Guang was conspiring with another highly influential official, the general Yang Su, with whom Yang Yong had a poor relationship. Yang Su thereafter praised Yang Guang repeatedly, causing Empress Dugu to further strengthen her relationship with him to try to have him persuade Emperor Wen to depose Yang Yong. Meanwhile, Yang Yong was beginning to realize Yang Guang's ambition, but his reaction—spending much time to try to have witches deflect ill fortune from him—further brought suspicion from Emperor Wen. As a final straw, Yang Guang bribed Yang Yong's associate Ji Wei (姬威) to make false accusations against Yang Guang, twisting Yang Guang's acts to appear treasonous. Yang Su then made public denunciations against Yang Yong, which Emperor Wen concurred in. In winter 600, Emperor Wen ordered that Yang Yong be deposed, and executed a number of officials who were close to Yang Yong or who dared to speak on his behalf. Yang Guang was created crown prince to replace Yang Yong.

== After removal ==
Yang Yong was put under house arrest at his palace and still given proper supplies, but Yang Guang was put in charge of having Yang Yong guarded. Yang Yong made repeated requests to personally appeal to Emperor Wen, but each request was blocked by Yang Guang. Yang Yong, desperate, often climbed onto trees to holler at Emperor Wen's palace, seeking to have Emperor Wen hear his cries. However, when Emperor Wen heard the cries, Yang Su falsely reported that Yang Yong had become irreparably psychotic after his removal. As a result, Emperor Wen never saw Yang Yong again.

In 602, Empress Dugu died. Thereafter, Emperor Wen began to have relationships with his concubines, particularly favoring Consort Chen (the sister of Chen's final emperor Chen Shubao) and Consort Cai.

In either 602 or 603, after Yang Yong's younger brother Yang Xiu the Prince of Shu was similarly accused of crimes and deposed, the official Pei Su (裴肅) submitted a petition to have Yang Yong and Yang Xiu be released from house arrest and given small fiefs, a proposal that Emperor Wen was tempted by, but ultimately did not accept.

In summer 604, Emperor Wen, while visiting his vacation palace Renshou Palace (仁壽宮, in modern Baoji, Shaanxi), grew gravely ill. Traditional historians allege (but admit that they did not have conclusive proof) that while Emperor Wen was growing ill, Yang Guang tried to rape Consort Chen. When Consort Chen revealed this to Emperor Wen, Emperor Wen became angry and wanted to depose Yang Guang and restore Yang Yong. However, Yang Guang and Yang Su had the two officials that Emperor Wen entrusted this task to—Liu Shu (柳述, the husband to Yang Yong's sister Yang Awu (楊阿五) the Princess Lanling) and Yuan Yan (元巖) -- arrested, and Emperor Wen soon died, a death that most historians attribute to assassination by Yang Guang's associate Zhang Heng (張衡).

Emperor Wen's death was kept secret for eight days, before Yang Guang announced it and took the throne (as Emperor Yang). Emperor Yang sent Yang Su's brother Yang Yue (楊約) back to Daxing. Once Yang Yue was back at Daxing, he forged an edict from Emperor Wen, ordering Yang Yong to commit suicide. When Yang Yong refused, Yang Yue strangled him, and only after Yang Yong died declared Emperor Wen's death. Emperor Yang posthumously created Yang Yong the Prince of Fangling, but did not allow any of Yang Yong's sons, who were reduced to commoner rank when Yang Yong was deposed, to inherit the title. In 607, Emperor Yang had Yang Yong's sons put to death.

== Family ==
Parents

- Father: Emperor Wen of Sui (隋文帝; 21 July 541 – 13 August 604)
- Mother: Empress Wenxian, of the Henan Dugu clan (文獻皇后 河南獨孤氏; 544 – 10 September 602)

Consort and their respective issue(s):

- Princess Consort Fangling, of the Yuan clan of Henan (房陵王妃 河南元氏)
- Lady of Virtue, of the Gao clan (高良娣)
  - Yang Yi, Prince of Anping (安平王 楊嶷; d.607), 4th son
  - Yang Ke, Prince Cheng of Xiang (襄城王 楊恪; d.607), 5th son
- Virtuous Lady, of the Wang clan (王良媛)
  - Yang Gai, Prince Gaoyang (高阳王 楊該; d.607), 6th son
  - Yang Shao, Prince Jian'an (建安王 楊韶;d.607), 7th son
- Lady of Bright Instruction, of the Yun clan (雲昭訓)
  - Yang Yan, Prince of Zhangning (長寧郡王 杨俨; d.607), 1st son
  - Yang Yu, Prince Yuan of Ping (平原王 楊裕; d.607), 2nd son
  - Yang Yun, Prince Cheng of An (安成王 楊筠; d.607), 3rd son
- Lady Cheng Ji (成姬)
  - Yang Jiong (楊煚; d.607), 8th son
- Unknown:
  - Princess of Daning (大宁公主杨氏), 1st daughter
    - married Gao Biaoren (高表仁), the third son of Gao Jiong (高熲)
  - Princess Fengning (丰宁公主; 583 – 610), personal name Jinghui (静徽), 2nd daughter
    - Married Wei Yuanzhao, Duke of Henan (河南郡公 韦圆照) of the Jingzhao Wei clan, grandson of Wei Xiaokuan
  - Yang Xiaoshi (楊孝實; d.607), 9th son
  - Yang Xiaofan (楊孝範; d.607), 10th son

== In popular culture ==
Yang Yong is portrayed by Hong Kong actor Liu Kai-chi in TVB's 1987 series The Grand Canal (大運河)
