= Su Wei (politician) =

Chinese politician of the Sui dynasty

Su Wei (蘇威; 542–623), courtesy name Wuwei (無畏), was a Chinese politician of the Chinese Sui dynasty. He first became an important official during the reign of Sui's founder Emperor Wen, and after Emperor Wen's death continued to serve Emperor Wen's son Emperor Yang. He was often praised for his abilities and integrity but criticized for pettiness. After Emperor Yang was assassinated in 618, he was nominally an official under Emperor Yang's nephew Yang Hao, and then under the warlords Yuwen Huaji, Li Mi, and Wang Shichong. After Wang Shichong's state of Zheng was destroyed by Tang dynasty in 621, neither the Tang general Li Shimin (the later Emperor Taizong) nor Li Shimin's father Emperor Gaozu of Tang was interested in retaining Su as an official, and Su Wei died soon thereafter.

== Background ==
Su Wei was born in 542, during the reign of Emperor Wen of Western Wei. His father Su Chuo (蘇綽) was the key assistant for Western Wei's paramount general Yuwen Tai. Su Chuo died around the new year 547, and Su Wei inherited his father's title. (Note: Historical sources are in conflict as to whether that title was Count of Meiyang or Duke of Meiyang, but the former seemed more probable.) After Yuwen Tai's death in 556, Yuwen Tai's nephew Yuwen Hu served as regent, and in 557 forced Emperor Gong of Western Wei to yield the throne to Yuwen Tai's son Yuwen Jue, ending Western Wei and founding Northern Zhou, although Yuwen Hu maintained power over the reigns of three emperors (Note: All were sons of Yuwen Tai.) -- Emperor Xiaomin (Note: whom Yuwen Hu later deposed and killed), Emperor Ming (Note: whom Yuwen Hu later poisoned), and Emperor Wu. Yuwen Hu was impressed with Su Wei's talent and gave his daughter the Princess Xinxing to Su Wei in marriage. Su Wei, however, was fearful of the power that his father-in-law wielded, believing that it would eventually be a source of disaster, so for a while he fled into the mountains to be a hermit. Soon thereafter, his uncle forced him out of the mountains back into governmental service, but he still spent much of his time in Buddhist temples, reading various books. His title was promoted to Duke of Huaidao.

In 572, Emperor Wu ambushed Yuwen Hu and killed him, taking power himself. He tried to retain Su in his government, but Su repeatedly declined under the excuse that he was ill. During this time, he was praised for his actions during a particular incident involving his cousin and her husband Yuan Xiong (元雄) -- Northern Zhou's ally Tujue had resented Yuan (Note: The reasons had been lost to history.) and had requested that Northern Zhou turn Yuan and his wife (Su's cousin) over to them for punishment. Su, believing that Tujue authorities could be bribed, sold all of his belongings to ransom his cousin and Yuan. He returned to governmental service during the reign of Emperor Wu's son Emperor Xuan.

In 580, the erratic Emperor Xuan died, and Emperor Xuan's father-in-law Yang Jian seized power as regent. As one of Yang's close advisors, Gao Jiong, had long praised Su for his abilities, Yang invited Su to join his staff. After serving under Yang for a month, Su heard that Yang was intending to seize the throne, and he fled into the country. Gao requested Yang's permission to track him down, but Yang responded, "He does not want to participate in what I will be doing. Ignore him for the time being." In 581, after Yang had Emperor Xuan's son Emperor Jing yield the throne to him, ending Northern Zhou and establishing the Sui dynasty as Emperor Wen, he summoned Su back to his government, and posthumously honored Su's father Su Chuo as the Duke of Pei, and then had Su Wei inherit the title.

== During Emperor Wen's reign ==
Emperor Wen made Su Wei the head of the examination bureau (Menxia Sheng, 門下省), one of the five main bureaus in his governmental structure, and the minister of finance as well as appointing him to assist with the legal reforms of the Kaihuang Code. Su, remembering that his father Su Chuo had often lamented at what heavy taxes he needed to impose on the people due to the governmental needs from the wars of the times, advocated reduction of taxes, and Emperor Wen agreed. At one point, Gao Jiong, believing Su to be more capable, offered to resign and transfer his authorities to Su, and Emperor Wen initially agreed, but then decided that Gao should not lose his position because of his ability to identify Su's talent. Rather, Emperor Wen had Gao and Su share their authorities, effectively as co-prime ministers.

In 582, at Su's suggestion, and after consulting Gao, Emperor Wen moved the capital from the old city of Chang'an to a nearby, newly built capital city of Daxing. (Note: later to be known as Chang'an as well)

In 583, at Su's suggestion, Emperor Wen abolished the commandery level of government, making county government directly below provincial government. Around that time, Emperor Wen, somewhat dissatisfied with the new laws that he promulgated after he became emperor, had Su and Niu Hong (牛弘) further revise the penal code, to reduce the number of laws and reduce the severity of punishment.

In 589, after Emperor Wen's forces conquered rival Chen dynasty and unified China, Su suggested that a local governmental layer, the township, be created, each with 500 households, headed by a mayor. Li Delin, who had often opposed Su's suggestions, pointed out that this would lead to situations where multiple counties would have to share one township and create confusion as well as potential for corruption by the mayors. Emperor Wen nevertheless agreed with Su. In the summer of that year, he also made Su one of the heads of the executive bureau (Shangshu Sheng, 尚書省). At that time, Su, along with Gao, Yu Qingze (虞慶則), and Emperor Wen's nephew Yang Xiong (楊雄) the Prince of Guangping, were known as the "four nobles" due to the power they wielded.

In 590, due to an investigative report submitted by Yu that pointed out that the township mayors were indeed often corrupt, Emperor Wen ordered that the township layer be abolished—but instead of punishing Su, he became angry when Li pointed out that he had previously opposed the idea but now wanted to wait to see if the idea could be reworked, and he demoted Li to a provincial governorship, particularly with Su accusing Li himself of corruption.

Also in 590, another ill-advised idea by Su contributed to a major problem that Sui was facing. After Chen's conquest, Su had written a work known as the Five Teachings (五教) and ordered that all former citizens of Chen be required to read and memorize it. (The Five Teachings is no longer extant but is believed to be a work that concentrated on loyalty to the emperor.) This, along with other dissatisfactions about Sui rule and rumors that Sui was about to force Chen's people to move to the Guanzhong region, caused mass-scale rebellions, which were eventually suppressed by Yang Su.

In 592, the official He Tuo (何妥), who had previously had disputes with Su, had a dispute with Su's son Su Kui (蘇夔), and was angry that despite Su Kui's younger status, the other officials were largely supporting Su Kui due to Su Wei's power. He therefore submitted a petition to Emperor Wen accusing Su Wei of factionalism and nepotism. Emperor Wen had Yu and his son Yang Xiu the Prince of Shu investigate, and the accusations were found true. In anger, Emperor Wen removed Su from his post and abolished his dukedom, although soon thereafter somewhat relented and restored Su's privilege to visit the palace, commenting, "Su Wei is virtuous, but was misled by the people around him." Yang Su took over Su Wei's posts. By summer 594, Emperor Wen had restored Su Wei to his dukedom and again made him the head of the examination bureau.

In 595, Su was accused of a lack of proper respect when accompanying Emperor Wen in sacrificing to the god of Mount Tai, and was removed, but soon restored. It was around this time that Emperor Wen made a comment that appears to be observant of Su's character -- "It has been said by many that Su Wei was only pretending to be clean and that his house was filled with gold and jade. That accusation is ridiculous. However, he is overly ferocious and unrealistic, and he overly paid attention to his reputation. He is happy if you go along with him and resents if you do not. That is his true problem."

In 597, Emperor Wen, in order to divide and conquer Tujue, married the daughter of a clansman, whom he created the Princess Anyi, to Tuli Khan Ashina Rangan, a subordinate khan to the leader of Tujue, the Dulan Khan Ashina Yongyulü. In order to solemnize the ceremony and further pull Ashina Rangan to his camp, Emperor Wen made Su, Niu, and Hulü Xiaoqing (斛律孝卿) masters of ceremony. (Note: Thereafter, Ashina Rangan became a submissive Sui vassal.)

In 601, after Gao had been removed from his post in 600, Su was restored to his prior post as co-head of the executive bureau, effectively serving as co-prime minister again with Yang Su.

== During Emperor Yang's reign ==
In 604, Emperor Wen died—a death that traditional historians, while admitting a lack of direct evidence, generally believed to be a murder ordered by his son and Yang Guang the Crown Prince. Yang Guang took the throne as Emperor Yang, and Su Wei continued to serve as co-prime minister.

In 606, Emperor Yang revised the methods for promoting officials, requiring not only that they be competent but also show virtues and specific accomplishments before they could be promoted. He put seven officials in charge of the process of reviewing officials' performance and promotions—Su, along with Niu Hong, Yuwen Shu, Zhang Jin (張瑾), Yu Shiji, Pei Yun (裴蘊), and Pei Ju, and they were known collectively as the "seven nobles of officialdom." However, although all seven consulted on the decisions, the main authority fell into the hands of Yu, and it was alleged that Yu decided the promotions based on the amounts of bribes he received.

In 607, despite Su's opposition, Emperor Yang built a section of the Great Wall from Yulin to Zihe (紫河, in modern Hohhot, Inner Mongolia), employing over a million men in labor. Su was subsequently removed from office. However, Su escaped the fate of Gao Jiong, Yuwen Bi (宇文弼), and Heruo Bi (賀若弼), who were executed for their similar oppositions to Emperor Yang's construction and military campaigns.

Sometime between 607 and 613, however, Su was again named the head of the examination bureau. In 613, when Yang Su's son Yang Xuangan rebelled against Emperor Yang in the midst of Emperor Yang's second campaign against Goguryeo, Emperor Yang asked Su whether Yang Xuangan, whom Emperor Yang considered intelligent, was capable of causing great trouble. Su responded, "Only a person who is capable of judging what is right and wrong and what is successful and unsuccessful can be called intelligent. Yang Xuangan is careless and unattentive, and he will not cause much trouble. What I am afraid of is that he is merely starting the prelude of great troubles." Much as Su feared, while Yang Xuangan's rebellion was quickly suppressed, thereafter, there was little peace for the rest of Sui's history.

In the fall of 615, while Emperor Yang was touring the frontier districts, Shibi Khan and the Eastern Turks launched a surprise attack against Yanmen Commandery in reprisal against various offenses by the emperor. Princess Yicheng—daughter of a Sui clansman—secretly informed the emperor of the attack, and Emperor Yang and his entourage fled to the safety of the commandery seat at present-day Daixian, Shanxi. Shibi Khan then besieged the town on September 11. Yuwen initially suggested that Emperor Yang fight his way out of the siege, but Su opposed taking such risks and eventually, under the advice of Emperor Yang's brother-in-law Xiao Yu, Emperor Yang sought more aid from Princess Yicheng. Emperor Yang's extravagant promises of promotion and reward brought reinforcements and Princess Yicheng falsely informed the khan that the Turks were under attack from the north. Shibi Khan then lifted the siege. With the northern empire under the effects of agrarian rebellions, Su subsequently advised Emperor Yang to return to the capital Chang'an, and Emperor Yang initially agreed. However, Yuwen suggested going to the eastern capital Luoyang instead, and Emperor Yang went to Luoyang and would never again go to Chang'an in his lifetime. Subsequently, when Su was examining the proposed promotions to soldiers based on their contributions assisting Yanmen Commandery lift the siege, he reviewed them strictly and promoted few of them, a decision that Emperor Yang agreed with, but which brought much dissension among the army ranks.

In 616, with the empire engulfed in rebellions, Emperor Yang was asking his officials how the rebellions were being suppressed. Yuwen falsely stated that the rebels had been reduced to less than 10% of what they used to be. Su initially declined to answer the question, but after Emperor Yang insisted on hearing his answer, he responded that while he did not know the numbers, the rebels were getting closer to Luoyang—and that, further, the taxes and labor levies were severely decreased due to rebel activities. He further pointed out that Emperor Yang was reneging on his promise to stop considering campaigns against Goguryeo. Emperor Yang was displeased. Further, at Duanwu Festival, while the other officials submitted treasures as gifts to the emperor, Su submitted a copy of the Classic of History. Emperor Yang was displeased when someone pointed out that the Classic of History contained a chapter entitled the Song of the Five Sons—a lament by the five brothers of King Taikang of Xia dynasty that he lost his kingdom due to his excessive cruelty and hunting—and believed that Su was criticizing him. He was further incensed when Su, while discussing the issue of another campaign against Goguryeo, sarcastically suggested that if Emperor Yang pardoned all of the agrarian rebels, there would be hundreds of thousands of soldiers available to attack Goguryeo. Emperor Yang thereafter complained about Su to Pei Yun, and Pei Yun then had a man named Zhang Xingben (張行本) accuse Su of inappropriate promotions and fear of Tujue. Emperor Yang removed Su from his posts, and then further accusations that Su was conspiring with Tujue were made. Emperor Yang had Pei Yun investigate it, and Pei proposed that Su be executed. Su, unable to prove his innocence, begged for forgiveness. Emperor Yang took pity and released him, but stripped him of citizenship rights, along with his descendants for three generations. Soon, however, it appeared that Su was restored to some extent, as he accompanied Emperor Yang to Jiangdu (江都, in modern Yangzhou, Jiangsu) in 617, although he was not restored to his posts, as Pei Yun and Yu suggested to Emperor Yang that Su was too old to be effective.

== After Emperor Yang's death ==
In spring 618, a coup led by the general Yuwen Huaji (Note: Yuwen Shu's son) killed Emperor Yang, along with a number of his relatives and high-level officials. Yuwen Huaji, however, did not kill Su, as Su was at that point no longer involved in policymaking. Further, as Su was respected by the officials and the people, Yuwen made Su the nominal leader of the government, although Yuwen was in actual control. Yuwen subsequently made Emperor Yang's nephew Yang Hao the Prince of Qin emperor, and Su became a part of Yang Hao's regime, as Yuwen soon abandoned Jiangdu and headed north toward Luoyang. Later that year, after Yuwen was defeated by Li Mi, Su surrendered to Li, and people were surprised when he bowed readily to Li, stating, "I did not know that today I will again see a capable ruler!" When Li was subsequently defeated by Sui troops under Wang Shichong, who at that point-controlled Luoyang and was nominally supporting Emperor Yang's grandson Yang Tong as emperor, Su surrendered to Wang and was restored to the title of Duke of Pei. In 619, after Wang had Yang Tong yielding the throne to him, ending Sui and establishing a state of Zheng, he gave Su honorific titles, although Su tried to decline them.

In 621, Wang, facing military pressure from Li Shimin, the son of Emperor Gaozu of Tang, surrendered. Li Shimin set up headquarters at Luoyang, and Su requested an audience with him, but stated that he was too old to bow to Li Shimin. Li Shimin sent back a messenger to rebuke him for bowing to Li Mi and Wang and refused to meet him. Su subsequently went to the Tang capital Chang'an and sought an audience with Emperor Gaozu, and was similarly rebuked and not given an office. He died in 623.

== Descendants ==
Su Wei had at least one son, Su Kui (苏夔), who served as hong lu qing during the Sui era. Su Kui's son, Su Dan (苏亶), was Inspector of Taizhou during Emperor Taizong's reign. Su Dan's son, Su Gui (苏瓌) had biographies in both Old Book of Tang and New Book of Tang. Su Dan's eldest daughter also became the wife and crown princess of Emperor Taizong's first crown prince Li Chengqian on 9 February 635.

== See also ==
- Collapse of the Sui
