= Yang Su =

Chinese military general and politician

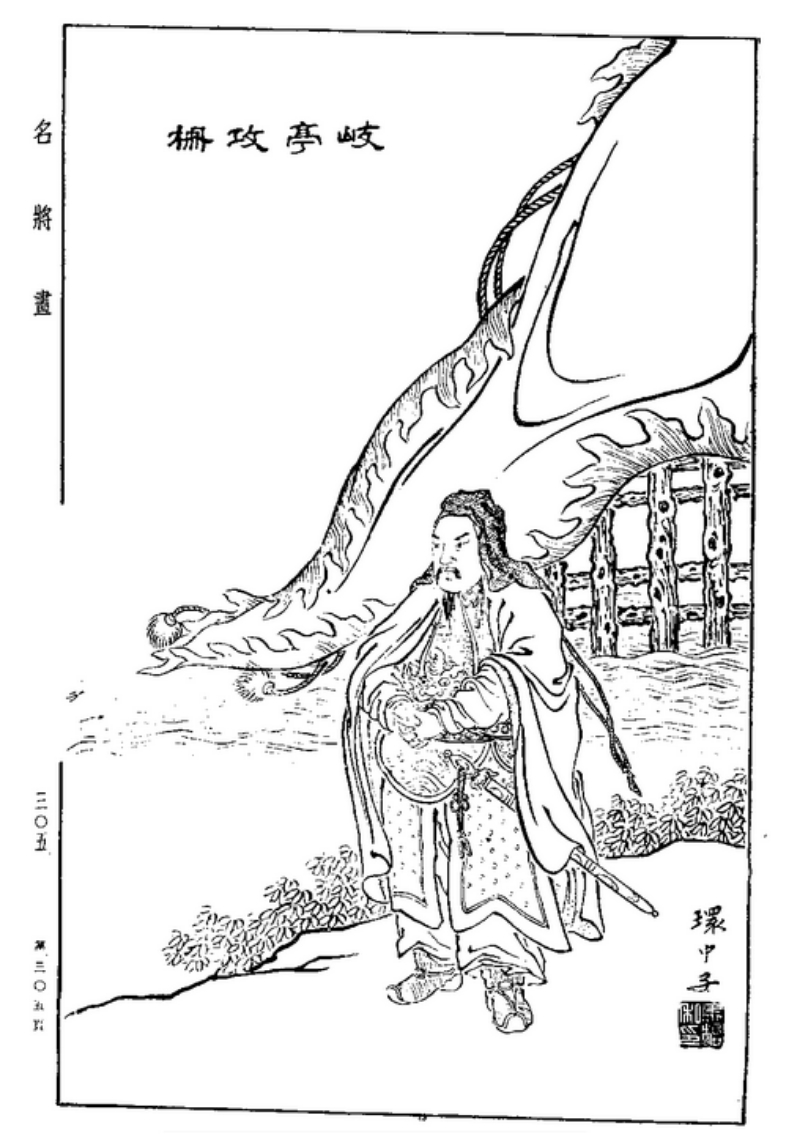
Yang Su

Yang Su (Chinese: 楊素; 544 – 31 August 606), courtesy name Chudao (處道), posthumous name Duke Jingwu of Chu (楚景武公), was a Chinese military general and politician of the Sui dynasty whose authority eventually became nearly as supreme as the emperor's. Traditional sinologists generally believed that he was involved in the suspected murder of Emperor Wen in 604, at the behest of Emperor Wen's son Yang Guang (the later Emperor Yang). His son Yang Xuangan later rebelled against Emperor Yang in 613 but was defeated and killed, and Yang Su's other sons were also executed.

== During Northern Zhou ==
Yang Su was born in 544. His grandfather Yang Xuan (楊喧) was a mid-level official under the Northern Wei or its branch successor state Western Wei. Yang Su's father Yang Fu (楊敷) served as a general for Western Wei's successor state Northern Zhou, but in 571, while defending Dingyang (定陽, in modern Linfen, Shanxi), Yang Fu was defeated and captured by the Northern Qi general Duan Shao. Yang Fu refused to surrender and was kept in captivity for the rest of his life, but it is not known when he died.

After Yang Fu's death, Yang Su, who was considered highly talented in his youth, repeatedly sought posthumous recognition for his father from Emperor Wu of Northern Zhou. Eventually, Emperor Wu was so pestered that he ordered that Yang Su be killed—perhaps stating the order publicly to scare Yang Su so that he would relent. Instead of begging for forgiveness, however, Yang Su yelled out, "I serve a ruthless emperor, and it is proper for me to die!"

Emperor Wu, impressed with Yang Su's fortitude, released him and gave Yang Fu posthumous honors, including the title of Duke of Linzhen. He made Yang Su an official in his administration, and once, when he had Yang Su draft an edict for him and was impressed by both the fast speed that Yang Su wrote the edict and the beauty of the language, he commented, "Just work hard. Honor and wealth will come to you."

Yang Su responded, "I am worried that I will be forced to accept honor and wealth, as I have no desire for them."

In 575, when Emperor Wu launched a major attack on Northern Qi, he granted Yang Su's request to lead the remains of Yang Fu's old army. While Emperor Wu was soon forced to abandon the campaign, Yang Su was, for his contributions, created the Viscount of Qinghe. When Emperor Wu relaunched the attack on Northern Qi in winter 576, Yang Su served under Emperor Wu's brother and major general Yuwen Xian the Prince of Qi, and during a battle, when Yuwen Xian was ambushed by forces under Northern Qi's emperor Gao Wei, it was Yang Su who fought hard to save Yuwen Xian. Thereafter, he continued to make contributions under Yuwen Xian during the campaign against Northern Qi.

After Emperor Wu conquered Northern Qi in 577, he promoted Yang Su's title to Duke of Chen'an. In 578, he served under the general Wang Gui (王軌) in defeating the Chen dynasty general Wu Mingche, and for this contribution, Emperor Wu created his brother Yang Shen (楊慎) the Marquess of Yi'an. After Emperor Wu's death later in 578 and succession by his son Emperor Xuan, Emperor Xuan conferred the title of Duke of Linzhen, which Emperor Wu had posthumously created Yang Fu, on Yang Su, transferring Yang Su's title of Duke of Cheng'an to his brother Yang Yuē (楊約). Yang Su subsequently served under the general Wei Xiaokuan in capturing the region between the Yangtze River and the Huai River from Chen.

In 580, Emperor Xuan, who had by that point become retired emperor, died, and Emperor Xuan's father-in-law Yang Jian seized power as regent over Emperor Xuan's son Emperor Jing. Yang Su became close to Yang Jian, and Yang Jian made him the governor of the important Bian Province (汴州 roughly modern Kaifeng, Henan). However, before Yang Su could report to Bian Province, the general Yuchi Jiong, suspicious of Yang Jian's intentions, rose against him.

One of Yuchi's supporters, Yuwen Zhou (宇文冑) the governor of Ying Province (滎州 roughly modern Zhengzhou, Henan) defended Hulao Pass against Yang Jian's forces, and Yang Jian sent Yang Su against Yuwen Zhou. Yang Su was able to defeat Yuwen Zhou, and after Yuchi had been defeated and had committed suicide, Yang Jian made Yang Su the commandant at Xu Province (徐州 roughly modern Xuzhou, Jiangsu) and promoted his title to Duke of Qinghe, transferring his title of Duke of Linzhen to his brother Yang Yuè (楊岳 note different tone and character than the other brother).

== During Emperor Wen's reign ==
In 581, Yang Jian had Emperor Jing yield the throne to him, ending Northern Zhou and establishing Sui dynasty as its Emperor Wen. Yang Su continued to serve in Emperor Wen's administration including a spell helping prepare the Kaihuang Code on which Emperor Wen's legal reforms were based. In 584, during an argument with his wife Zheng Qiye (郑祁耶), he angrily stated, "If I become emperor, you will not be empress!" Zheng Qiye, in anger, reported the comment to Emperor Wen, who removed Yang Su from his post as a punishment. In 585, Emperor Wen restored him and made him the commandant at Xin Province (modern eastern Chongqing) to prepare an attack against Chen down the Yangtze River. While at Xin Province, he built large ships in anticipation of the attack.

In winter 588, Emperor Wen launched the attack, commissioning his sons Yang Guang the Prince of Jin and Yang Jun, along with Yang Su, to command the three main prongs of the attack, with Yang Guang in overall command of the operations. Yang Su's responsibility was to take his forces down the Yangtze and attack cities on the river. He passed through the Three Gorges and defeated the Chen general Qi Xin (戚昕). He soon ran into heavy resistance by the Chen general Lü Zhongsu (呂忠肅) and initially was repelled, but eventually was able to defeat Lü. With Chen Shubao's cousin Chen Huiji (陳慧紀) abandoning the region to make one last-ditch attempt to reach the Chen capital Jiankang to help defend it against Yang Guang's attack, Yang Su encountered no further resistance, and soon news that Jiankang had fallen arrived, and the local provinces all surrendered to him or Yang Jun, whom he met at Hankou (漢口 in modern Wuhan, Hubei). Emperor Wen subsequently promoted Yang Su to the greater title of Duke of Yue and transferred his title of Duke of Qinghe to his son Yang Xuanjiang (楊玄獎), while making his heir apparent Yang Xuangan a mid-level official. He was briefly made the commandant at Jing Province (荊州 roughly modern Jingzhou, Hubei), but in summer 588 was recalled to the capital to be the head of the examination bureau (門下省 Menxia Sheng) -- one of the most important officials in the imperial government. In 590, he was made the head of the legislative bureau (內史省 Neishi Sheng).

Later in 590, with Chen's former territory up in rebellions against imposition of Sui laws, Yang Su was put in command of a large army to attack the various rebel leaders. He defeated Shen Xuanhui (沈玄懀) and Gao Zhihui (高智慧), eventually quelling much of the former Chen territory. Emperor Wen awarded him with many gifts. Based on Yang Su's conduct during the campaign, the historian Sima Guang, in his Zizhi Tongjian, commented:

When Yang Su commanded large armies, he showed flexibility and much tactical capability. His military discipline was harsh, and before each battle, he always sought out soldiers who had faults to execute in order to show his power -- sometimes more than a hundred, and sometimes no less than 20. As their blood flowed before him, he treated as if it were nothing, and continued to smile and talk. When it came time for battling, he would send out somewhere between 100 to 200 soldiers as a forward corps to attack first. If they were unsuccessful in penetrating the enemy lines and returned, regardless of how many survived, they would all be executed. He would then repeat the process, but with 200 to 300 soldiers. All officers and soldiers tremored with fear, and all fought with resolution to fight to the death. Therefore, he was always victorious and considered a great general. At that time, Yang Su was powerful and favored by the emperor. Whatever he suggested was not refused, and so Yang Su's followers, even if their contributions were small, would be rewarded for their contributions. The soldiers under the other generals often had their contributions denied by the civilian officials and not rewarded. Therefore, even though Yang Su was cruel, his soldiers were willing to follow him.

Around the new year 593, Yang Su was made a co-head of the executive bureau (尚書省 Shangshu Sheng) with Gao Jiong, effectively serving as co-prime ministers, replacing Su Wei in that role. It was said that by this point, Yang Su had become very arrogant, and among the officials, he only respected Gao, Niu Hong (牛弘), and Xue Daoheng (薛道衡), looking down at and bullying the rest. It was commented by traditional historians that he was more talented and had more foresight than Gao, but that he was not as fair-minded or well-behaved as Gao.

In spring 593, Emperor Wen commissioned Yang Su to oversee the building of his vacation palace, Renshou Palace (仁壽宮 in modern Baoji, Shaanxi). Yang Su spent much effort building it to be a luxurious palace, needing not much architectural work but landscaping of the nearby hills and valleys. Much human life was lost—numbering in the tens of thousands. The palace was completed in spring 595, and when Emperor Wen inspected it, he, by nature frugal, was initially displeased and stated, "Yang Su expended money and effort to build this palace, and he made the people hate me." Yang Su was fearful of punishment, but when Emperor Wen's wife Empress Dugu arrived, she pointed out to Emperor Wen that Yang Su knew that they had little other pleasures, and therefore built the palace in this manner. She gave Yang Su awards in both money and silk.

In 598, both Empress Dugu and Yang Su's wife Zheng Qiye were ill, and suspicions came on the official Dugu Tuo (獨孤陀)--who was Empress Dugu's half-brother and whose wife was Yang Su's half-sister. Dugu Tuo was accused of having his servant girl Xu Ani (徐阿尼) employ cat spirits to curse Empress Dugu and Zheng Qiye, and was nearly executed, but at Empress Dugu's urging was spared and only reduced to commoner rank.

In spring 599, Yang Su was one of the major generals commissioned to attack Tujue's Dulan Khan, Ashina Yongyulü, along with Gao Jiong and Yan Rong (燕榮). He encountered Ashina Yongyulü's subordinate khan, the Datou Khan Ashina Dianjue. Contrary to prior strategies to first protect his army before engaging, he quickly engaged Ashina Dianjue and defeated him, forcing Ashina Dianjue to flee.

Sometime around that time, Emperor Wen and Empress Dugu, who generally had a loving relationship, had a major conflict—over an affair by Emperor Wen (who otherwise did not have any concubines, in contrast with nearly every other emperor in Chinese history) with Yuchi Jiong's granddaughter, who had become a servant in the palace. Empress Dugu killed Lady Yuchi, and in anger, Emperor Wen rode away from the palace. Yang Su and Gao had to track him down and persuade him back to the palace. Yang Su and Gao subsequently held a banquet for them to allow them to reconcile.

In winter 599, Emperor Wen sent Yang Su again to attack Ashina Yongyulü, but before his army could depart, Ashina Yongyulü was assassinated and replaced by Ashina Dianjue (as Bujia Khan), and so Yang Su did not launch his army. In 600, when Ashina Dianjue attacked, Emperor Wen sent Yang Su and Shi Wansui (史萬歲), along with his sons Yang Guang and Yang Liang, to resist, and Ashina Dianjue was fought off. (The historians had much to say as to Shi's success during this campaign, but not Yang Su's, suggesting that Yang Su was not involved in major engagements during this campaign.)

By 600, Emperor Wen's crown prince Yang Yong had lost the favor of Emperor Wen and Empress Dugu, over his wastefulness (which displeased Emperor Wen) and having many concubines (which displeased Empress Dugu). Yang Guang, whom Emperor Wen and Empress Dugu, had for some time plotted to replace Yang Yong, sent his associate Yuwen Shu to persuade Yang Su's brother Yang Yuē that, as Yang Su did not have a good relationship with Yang Yong, that if Emperor Wen died, Yang Su and his brothers would soon be in danger under Yang Yong's rule. Rather, Yuwen suggested, Yang Su should form a pact with Yang Guang and try to have Yang Guang made crown prince. Yang Su agreed, and began to discuss with Empress Dugu in earnest the possibility of replacing Yang Yong with Yang Guang. Empress Dugu was pleased, and requested Yang Su to persuade Emperor Wen as well. By fall 600, Yang Guang had Yang Yong's associate Ji Wei (姬威) falsely accuse Yang Yong of plotting treason. Emperor Wen commissioned Yang Su to investigate, and Yang Su intentionally misinterpreted evidence and manufactured additional evidence, causing Emperor Wen to believe that Yang Yong was indeed plotting treason. Emperor Wen deposed Yang Yong and created Yang Guang crown prince instead.

In winter 601, Emperor Wen commissioned Yang Su to command an army, in association with Qimin Khan Ashina Rangan (who had surrendered to Sui and whom Emperor Wen had created khan), to attack Ashina Dianjue. In spring 602, Yang Su achieved a great victory, and for his victory, Yang Xuangan's post was upgraded, and another son of Yang Su, Yang Xuanzong (楊玄縱), was created the Duke of Huainan.

By 602, Yang Guang was concerned that his brother, Yang Xiu the Prince of Shu, who as the commandant at Yi Province (roughly modern Chengdu, Sichuan) was in control of the modern Sichuan and Chongqing region, would eventually make trouble for him. He had Yang Su collect evidence of Yang Xiu's wastefulness and inappropriate behavior. Emperor Wen summoned Yang Xiu back to the capital, and had Yang Su investigate. Both Yang Guang and Yang Su manufactured additional evidence against Yang Xiu, and Yang Xiu was reduced to commoner rank and put under house arrest.

Also in 602, Empress Dugu died. Yang Su was in charge of the funeral arrangements, and in appreciation, Emperor Wen created yet another son of Yang Su the Duke of Yikang. Upon accusations by the official Liang Pi (梁毗) that Yang Su was becoming overly powerful and abusive, Emperor Wen began to distance himself from Yang Su, although he continued to confer honors on Yang Su. The actual authority over the executive bureau was instead exercised by Su Wei and Emperor Wen's son-in-law Liu Shu (柳述).

In summer 604, while at Renshou Palace, Emperor Wen became ill. Yang Su, Liu, and Yuan Yan (元儼) attended to him. Emperor Wen soon died, and Yang Guang, after ordering Yang Su's brother Yang Yuē to have Yang Yong killed, announced Emperor Wen's death and took the throne as Emperor Yang.

Traditional historians, while admitting a lack of direct evidence, largely believed an account that Emperor Wen's death was a murder ordered by Yang Guang, with Yang Su in cooperation. This account alleged that Yang Guang attempted to rape Emperor Wen's concubine Consort Chen (Chen Shubao's sister), and when Consort Chen reported the attempted rape to Emperor Wen, Emperor Wen tried to depose Yang Guang and sent Liu and Yuan to summon Yang Yong back. Yang Su arrested Liu and Yuan, and then Yang Guang sent his associate Zhang Heng (張衡) to kill Emperor Wen.

== During Emperor Yang's reign ==
Upon hearing Emperor Yang's ascension, Yang Liang, then the commandant at Bing Province (并州 roughly modern Taiyuan, Shanxi) and in control of the territory north of the Yellow River, rebelled—inexplicably declaring, as his reason for rebelling, that Yang Su had committed treason. Emperor Yang sent Yang Su to attack Yang Liang, and Yang Su, after capturing Yang Liang's major general Xiao Mohe, forced Yang Liang's surrender. For Yang Su's contributions, Emperor Yang gave his sons Yang Wandan (楊萬石), Yang Renxing (楊仁行), and Yang Xuanting (楊玄挺) all mid-level imperial posts and much treasure, previously owned by Yang Liang.

In spring 605, Emperor Yang began to expand Luoyang to serve as the eastern capital. Yang Su was commissioned to head the project.

It was said that although Yang Su had much contributions for him, Emperor Yang actually was very suspicious of Yang Su. When imperial astrologers informed Emperor Yang that the Sui region (central Hubei) would have a major funeral, Emperor Wen created Yang Su the Duke of Chu, technically a greater title—believing that the Chu and Sui regions were close enough that he could use Yang Su to deflect the ill fortune. When Yang Su grew ill in 606, Yang Guang sent the imperial physicians, along with the most precious medicines, to treat Yang Su, but closely monitored Yang Su's conditions, hoping that Yang Su would die. Yang Su himself knew of Emperor Yang's intentions, and therefore refused all treatment and did not take good care of his own body, stating to Yang Yue, "Why should I want to live?" He died in fall 606, and Emperor Yang honored him with a magnificent funeral. After Yang Xuangan rebelled in 613, all of Yang Su's sons were killed. Yang Su's tomb was destroyed, and Yang Su's body was burned by the general Wei Wensheng (衛文昇). But one daughter of his would later become a concubine of Emperor Gaozu of Tang and bear him a son named Li Yuanxiang (李元祥) and titled Prince of Jiang, while his granddaughter through his son Yang Xuanjing would become a concubine of Emperor Taizong of Tang and bear him a son named Li Fu (李福) and titled Prince of Zhao.

It was said that one of Yang Su's favorite dishes was fried rice and that he popularized the dish. In the Book of Sui, Yang Su was described as a man with imposing look and a shiny long beard.

== In popular culture ==
Yang Su is portrayed by Hong Kong actor Lau Dan in TVB's 1987 series The Grand Canal (大運河).

== Reading ==
- Book of Sui, vol. 48.
- History of Northern Dynasties, vol. 41.
- Zizhi Tongjian, vols. 170, 172, 174, 175, 176, 177, 178, 179, 180.
