= Yang Jun (prince) =

Prince of Chinese Sui dynasty (571-600)

Yang Jun (楊俊) (571 – 4 August 600), nicknamed Azhi (阿祇) and formally known as Prince Xiao of Qin (秦孝王), was an imperial prince of the Chinese Sui dynasty. He was a son of Emperor Wen (Yang Jian) and his powerful wife, Empress Dugu. Yang Jun died as a result of an illness caused by poisoning, allegedly by his jealous wife, Princess Cui. His son, Yang Hao, was later briefly declared emperor by the general Yuwen Huaji after Yuwen killed Yang Jun's brother, Emperor Yang, in 618.

== Family ==
Parents

- Father: Emperor Wen of Sui (隋文帝; 21 July 541 – 13 August 604)
- Mother: Empress Wenxian, of the Henan Dugu clan (文獻皇后 河南獨孤氏; 544–602)

Consort and their respective issue(s):

- Princess Consort Xiao of Qin, of the Cui clan of Boling (秦孝妃 博陵崔氏; d. 600)
  - Yang Hao, Prince of Qin (秦王 楊浩, d 23 October 618), first son
  - Yang Zhan, Marquis of Jibei (济北侯 杨湛; d. 618), second son
- Concubine Chen, of the Yingchuan chen clan (妾潁川陳氏), known as Princess Lingcheng (临成公主)
- Unknown:
  - Princess Yongfeng (永丰公主), first daughter
  - Lady Yang, second daughter

== Early life ==
Yang Jun was born in 571 as the third son of Yang Jian and Dugu Qieluo, following his brothers Yang Yong and Yang Guang. In 581, Yang Jian seized the throne from Emperor Jing of Northern Zhou, ending the Northern Zhou dynasty and establishing the Sui dynasty as Emperor Wen. Yang Jian then created his sons princes, granting Yang Jun the title of Prince of Qin. In 582, at age 11, Yang Jun was appointed governor of Luo Province (洛州, roughly modern Luoyang, Henan) and was nominally designated as the commander of the armed forces east of the Hangu Pass. By 583, he had become commandant of Qin Province (秦州, roughly modern Tianshui, Gansu) and oversaw the surrounding regions. Around this period, Yang Jun became a devout Buddhist, known for his kindness. At one point, he requested permission from Emperor Wen to become a monk, a request that was ultimately denied by the emperor.

== Military and political career ==
In 586, Yang Jun was appointed as the regional executive for the provinces south of the Qinling Mountains, stationed in Xiangyang (襄陽, in modern Xiangfan, Hubei). Around this time, his wife, Princess Cui—sister of the general Cui Hongdu (崔弘度)—gave birth to their first son, Yang Hao. In 588, when Emperor Wen launched a major campaign against the rival Chen dynasty, Yang Jun was stationed at Hankou (漢口, in modern Wuhan, Hubei) and appointed commander of Sui forces in the central Yangtze River region. The Chen general Zhou Luohou (周羅睺) arrived to counter Yang Jun's forces, but Yang Jun, seeking to avoid significant battle losses, opted for a stalemate rather than direct engagement. This strategy effectively blocked Chen reinforcements from reaching their capital, Jiankang, which was subsequently attacked by Yang Jun's brother, Yang Guang.

When Jiankang fell and the Chen emperor Chen Shubao was captured, Zhou surrendered. Despite this, Chen Shubao's brother, Chen Shushen (陳叔慎), and cousin Chen Zhengli (陳正理) attempted to resist from Chen Shushen’s post at Xiang Province (湘州, roughly modern Changsha, Hunan). Sui generals Xue Zhou (薛冑) and Liu Ren'en (劉仁恩) defeated and captured Chen Shushen, delivering him to Yang Jun, who subsequently executed him.

In a report to Emperor Wen, Yang Jun expressed humility, stating, "It is unfortunate that I am given even the task of grinding grains, as I contributed nothing to the war effort, and am ashamed of it." Emperor Wen, however, appreciated Yang Jun's modesty. When Chen Shubao and his family were presented to Emperor Wen, Yang Guang and Yang Jun led the procession into the palace as victors. Subsequently, Emperor Wen appointed Yang Jun as commandant at Yang Province (揚州, roughly modern Yangzhou, Jiangsu), overseeing 44 provinces, most of which were former Chen territories. In 590, Emperor Wen reassigned Yang Jun to Bing Province (并州, roughly modern Taiyuan, Shanxi), placing him in charge of 24 provinces, while Yang Guang took over Yang Jun's previous command.

== Fall from grace ==
While at Bing Province, Yang Jun began to lead a life of luxury, even building palaces that exceeded what was considered appropriate for an imperial prince. He also acquired many concubines, which angered his wife, Princess Cui, who became jealous and resentful of his behavior. In 597, she poisoned melons that Yang Jun was eating, causing him to fall seriously ill and necessitating his return to Chang'an for treatment. Upon learning of Yang Jun’s excessive spending and lavish lifestyle, Emperor Wen, who valued frugality, was displeased with his son’s wastefulness. In the fall of 597, Emperor Wen removed Yang Jun from all his posts and stripped him of his duties, allowing him to retain only his title as an imperial prince.

It was soon discovered that Princess Cui was responsible for poisoning Yang Jun. In response, Emperor Wen ordered their divorce, sent her back to her family, and then commanded her to commit suicide. Generals Liu Sheng (劉昇) and Yang Su argued that Yang Jun's punishment was overly harsh, but Emperor Wen replied:

I am the father of just five sons, not the father of all people across the land. If I agreed with you, does that mean I should create a Penal Code for the Emperor's Sons? Even a man as benevolent as the Duke of Zhou executed his brothers, the lords of Guan and Cai, for their crimes. I am not as great as the Duke of Zhou, so can I break my own laws?

Emperor Wen thus did not allow Yang Jun to return to his previous positions. Thereafter, Yang Jun’s health deteriorated further, and by 600, he was gravely ill. He sent messengers with a petition seeking forgiveness, but Emperor Wen refused to pardon him. Only when Yang Jun was close to death did Emperor Wen confer upon him the honorific title of Shang Zhuguo (上柱國), which, in the Sui dynasty's nine-rank system, was first rank, second class, but carried no actual authority.

== Death and legacy ==
Yang Jun died in the summer of 600, and it was noted that Emperor Wen shed only a few tears before stopping. He ordered that all the overly luxurious items Yang Jun had created be destroyed. When Yang Jun's staff requested permission to erect a stone monument in his honor, Emperor Wen responded:

For a person to earn a good name, only a few pages in a history book are sufficient. Why would he need a monument? If his descendants cannot honor his legacy, the monument will only end up as rubble, serving no purpose beyond a paperweight.

Yang Jun was survived by two sons: Yang Hao, born to Princess Cui, and Yang Zhan (楊湛), born to a concubine. The imperial officials, sensing that Emperor Wen would likely disapprove of either son inheriting Yang Jun's title, advised against it. They argued that Yang Hao was tainted by Princess Cui's crimes, and that Yang Zhan, as the son of a concubine, should not inherit the title. Emperor Wen agreed with their advice and assigned Yang Jun's staff as his mourners instead.

Yang Jun's eldest daughter, Princess Yongfeng, who was 11 at the time, mourned her father with such devotion that historians later praised her piety. It was not until 604, when Yang Guang ascended to the throne, that Yang Hao was allowed to inherit the title of Prince of Qin, and Yang Zhan was created the Marquess of Jibei.
