= 620s =

Decade

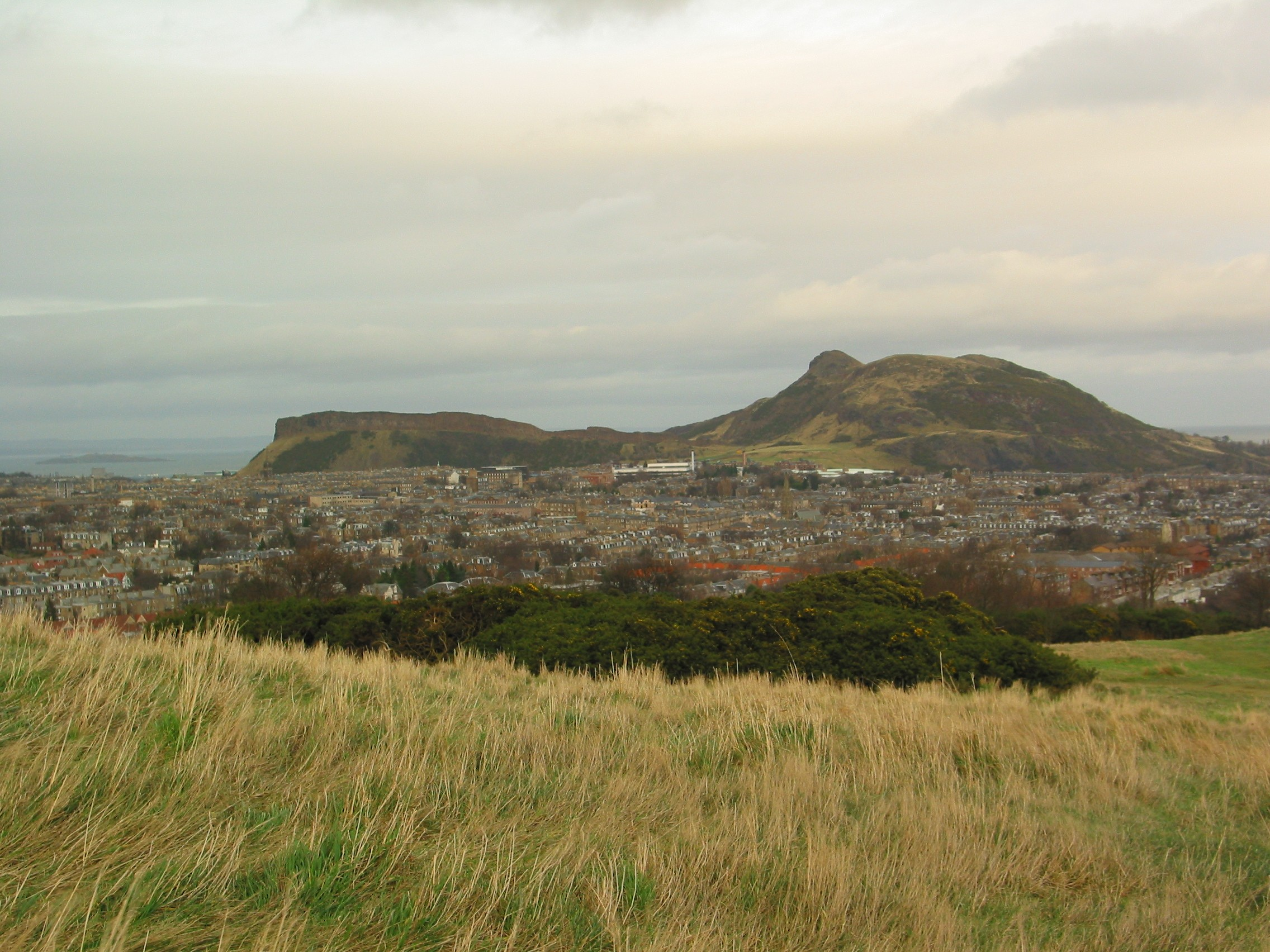
Salisbury Crags (left) and Arthur's Seat (right) in Edinburgh, Scotland (supposedly founded in 626)

The 620s decade ran from January 1, 620, to December 31, 629.

== Events ==
=== 620 ===
==== By place ====
====== Byzantine Empire ======
- Byzantine–Sassanid War: King Khosrau II captures Ancyra, an important Byzantine military base in central Anatolia. After the conquest of Egypt and Palestine, he restores the Persian Empire as it existed in 490 BC under Darius I.
- The Slavs invade the area around Thessaloniki, which is unsuccessfully besieged. The city becomes a Byzantine enclave surrounded by Slavic territory. Urban life disappears and many towns in the Balkan Peninsula become villages.

====== Britain ======
- The Angles under King Edwin of Northumbria invade Rheged ("Old North") in Northern England, and expel King Llywarch Hen. He flees to Powys, and becomes a famous bard. Edwin's armies fight against Gododdin and Strathclyde.

====== Asia ======
- King Pulakeshin II defeats the Harsha army on the banks of the Narmada River. Harsha loses a major part of his elephant force and retreats. A truce establishes Narmada as the northern boundary of the Chalukya Kingdom (India).

====== America ======
- The town of Cholula is founded in central Mexico (later said to be the oldest continuously occupied town in all of North America).

==== By topic ====
====== Religion ======
- Weltenburg Abbey in Bavaria (Germany) is founded by Benedictine monks.
- Isra and Mi'raj (Muhammad's ascension to heaven to meet Allah).

=== 621 ===
==== By place ====
====== Byzantine Empire ======
- Emperor Heraclius concludes a peace agreement (in exchange for an annual tribute) with the Avars on the Balkan Peninsula, giving him a free hand to assemble Byzantine forces in Asia Minor, for non-military expenditure against the Persian Empire.
- The city of Málaga, in southern Spain in the province of Spania, is conquered by the Visigoths.

====== Europe ======
- King Sisebut dies after a 9-year reign and is succeeded by his son Reccared II (just a child). Reccared is placed on the throne by the Visigothic nobility, but dies after two months. Suintila, his half-uncle and regent, becomes king of the Visigothic Kingdom.

====== Asia ======
- Emperor Gaozu delegates control of his military and civil administration in the east to his second son, Li Shimin. He concentrates on reforming coinage (→ Kaiyuan Tongbao) and taxation.
- May 28 – Battle of Hulao: Li Shimin defeats the numerically superior army of Dou Jiande near the Hulao Pass.
- June 4 – Wang Shichong, self-declared emperor, surrenders to Li Shimin at Luoyang following Dou Jiande's defeat. Gaozu spares his life, but he is later assassinated.

==== By topic ====
====== Religion ======
- Islamic tradition says Muhammad visited heaven aboard the winged mount Buraq, in the Isra wal-Miraj, (the Night Journey), from Mecca to Jerusalem, then to heaven from Jerusalem's Temple Mount, then back to Mecca.

====== Technology ======
- The Chinese establish an imperial bureau for the manufacture of porcelain. Their technology will advance further under the Tang dynasty (approximate date).

=== 622 ===
==== By place ====
====== Byzantine Empire ======
- Byzantine–Sasanian War: Emperor Heraclius sails from Constantinople with an expeditionary force (probably 50,000 men), and starts a counter-offensive against the Persian Empire (his young son, Constantine III, is left behind as regent under the charge of Sergius I, patriarch of Constantinople, and patrician Bonus). He lands a few days later at the junction of Cilicia and Syria, near Alexandretta and ancient Issus.
- Battle of Issus: Heraclius defeats the Persian forces under Shahrbaraz in Cappadocia. He recaptures Anatolia, but returns to Constantinople to deal with the threat posed to his Balkan domains by the Avars, and puts the Byzantine army into winter quarters in Pontus.

====== Asia ======
- The Western Turks conquer the Oxus valley and cooperate with Heraclius against Persia, taking Khorasan (modern Afghanistan).

====== Central America ======
- March 28 – Tajoom Ukʼab Kʼahkʼ becomes the ruler of the Mayan city state of Calakmul in southern Mexico and reigns until 630.

==== By topic ====
====== Religion ======
- September 9 or June 17 – The Islamic prophet Muhammad, after being commanded by God Almighty, secretly leaves his home in Mecca to make the Hijrah (emigrate) to Yathrib (later renamed by him Medina), along with his companion Abu Bakr. They take refuge in the Cave of Thawr south of Mecca for three days, departing on September 13 or June 21.
- September 20 or June 28 – Muhammad does not enter Yathrib directly, but stops at its outlying environs of Quba. He establishes the Quba Mosque here, the first mosque of Islam. On July 2 (or September 24) he makes his first visit to Yathrib for Friday prayers.
- October 4 or July 13 – After a fourteen days' stay in Quba, Muhammad finally moves from Quba to Yathrib, and is greeted cordially by its people. Here he drafts the Constitution of Medina, an agreement between the various Muslim, Jewish, Christian and pagan tribal communities in the city, forming the basis of a multi-religious Islamic state, and begins construction of the Al-Masjid an-Nabawi Mosque. Later during the caliphate of Umar in 638, the lunar year during which the emigration to Medina occurred (Friday 16 July 622 – 4 July 623) is designated "Year One" of the new Hijri era (Anno Hegirae – AH).
- Xuanzang is fully ordained as a Buddhist monk at the age of 20.

=== 623 ===
==== By place ====
====== Byzantine Empire ======
- Byzantine–Sassanid War: Emperor Heraclius invades Armenia, leaving his son Constantine (age 11) and co-regent Bonus to defend Constantinople against the Persians still at Chalcedon (modern Turkey). He sails with 5,000 reinforcements to join the Byzantine army at Trapezus. Raising additional forces in Pontus, Heraclius strikes through the mountains of Armenia and the northern sub-Caucasian principalities. He plunders Media (Azerbaijan), and avoids the Persian armies who attempt to trap him.

====== Europe ======
- King Clothar II gives Austrasia to his son Dagobert I, age 20, effectively granting the kingdom semi-autonomy in repayment for the support of its nobles, most notably Pepin of Landen (Mayor of the Palace), and in recognition of calls from the Austrasians for a king of their own. Arnulf, bishop of Metz, becomes advisor to Dagobert.
- Samo, reputedly a Frankish merchant, is elected king of the Slavs in Moravia, Slovakia and Lower Austria. A string of victories over the Avars proves his utilitas (usefulness) to his subjects, and he secures the throne to establish his own kingdom, which stretches from the upper Elbe to the Danube.

====== Asia ======
- Tuyuhun invasion of Gansu: Tang forces under Chai Shao defeat the Tuyuhun, and prevent further incursions into Gansu (China).

==== By topic ====
====== Art ======
- Tori Busshi makes "Shaka Triad", in the kon-dō of Hōryū-ji, during the Asuka period (approximate date).

====== Religion ======
- The Jewish community in Medina (Saudi Arabia) rejects the idea of Muhammad being a leader of Judaism. He and his followers stop bowing toward Jerusalem and start bowing toward Makkah.

=== 624 ===
==== By date ====
====== January–June ======
- January 26 – (29 Rajab 2 AH) The Raid on Nakhla, the first successful raid the Muslims of Medina, against the Quraysh tribe in Mecca, is carried out by Abd Allah ibn Jahsh, who leads the plunder of a caravan of supplies.
- February 11 – While praying in the Masjid al-Qiblatayn in Medina, the Islamic prophet Muhammad receives revelations from God on the qibla, the direction of prayer, that he should be facing Mecca rather than Jerusalem during prayer, beginning an Islamic tradition.
- February – Chinese General Li Daliang leads an army to retake the Yu prefecture, near Xuancheng in what is now the Anhui province, from the rebel leader Fu Gongshi.
- March 13 – (17 Ramadah 2 AH) The Battle of Badr takes place in what is now Saudi Arabia as Muhammad and some 300 of his followers from Medina surprise a reinforced Meccan caravan at Badr (modern-day Saudi Arabia) returning from Syria, and defeat about 1,000 Quraysh from Mecca. After having heard that clan leader Abu Sufyan is escorting a rich trade caravan, Muhammad has the wells along its route (southwest of Medina) filled with sand in order to lure him into battle.
- March 25 – Heraclius, Emperor of Byzantium, departs from his capital at Constantinople (now Istanbul in Turkey) with his wife, the Empress Martina, and two of his children, and does not return for more than four years.
- April 9 – (15 Shawwal 2 AH) The Siege of Banu Qaynuqa is started by the Muslims in what is now Yathrib in Saudi Arabia, four days after Ghalib ibn Abd Allah al-Laythi is dispatched by Muhammad.
- April 15 – Emperor Haraclius celebrates Easter at Nicomedia (now İzmit) then travels to Caesarea (now Kayseri), proceeding during April to Theodosiopolis. He leads troops into Armenia and sacks its capital, Dvin.
- April 20 – (27th day of the 3rd month of the 6th year of the Wu'de era) Du Fuwei, a Chinese prince who rebelled against Sui dynasty China and then was rewarded with the title "Prince of Wu" by Emperor Gaozu of Tang, dies suddenly of poisoning, under suspicion that he has been ordered killed by the Emperor.
- April 20 – Heraclius invades the Sassanid Empire (now Iran).
- April 24 – St. Justus is appointed as the new Archbishop of Canterbury by Pope Boniface V upon the death of Archbishop Mellitus., receiving the pallium — symbol of the jurisdiction entrusted to archbishops. He oversees the dispatch of missionaries to Northumbria in northern England to convert the Anglo-Saxons to Christianity.
- June 23 – While at Ganzak at what is now northwest Iran, the Sassanid Emperor Khosrow II (Chosroes) is informed by soldiers who had escaped capture that Emperor Heraclius of Byzantium is preparing a surprise attack. Khosrow dispatches an envoy to inform General Shahrbaraz to abandon a campaign in Asia Minor and to accompany him to face Heraclius.
- June – (Dhu al-Hijjah AH 2) The Invasion of Sawiq is carried out against the Muslims by the Quraysh leader, Abu Sufyan ibn Harb.

====== July–December ======
- August 12 – The Army of the Eastern Turkic Khaganate, led by Illig Qaghan, clashes with the army of Tang dynasty China, led by Taizong, Prince of Qin and son of Emperor Gaozu, with fighting taking place west of Binzhou in what is now the Shandong province.
- August – Upon the death of Khunays ibn Hudhafa, a companion of Muhammad, Khunays's widow Hafsa bint Umar becomes eligible to marry Muhammad.
- November 11 – (9th B'ak'tun, 9th K'atun,9th year, 12th month, 3rd day) In what is now Guatemala, a stele is carved to honor a victory in battle by Kʼinich Yoʼnal Ahk I, the Mayan ruler of Piedras Negras
- November –
  - Zayd ibn Haritha, the Sahabi and military commander for Muhammad is sent on an expedition to Dhat Irq near Mecca. He then carries out the Al-Qarada raid of a caravan of Meccan merchants after discovering their trade route and captures more that 100,000 dirhams worth of goods
- December 21 – A group of 1,000 Muslims from Mecca, led by Abu Sufyan ibn Harb, sets out from Mecca to capture Medina, defended by the Banu Khazraj tribe, led by Abd Allah ibn Ubayy. The two forces will fight combat three months later, on March 23, 625, at the Battle of Uhud.

==== By place ====
====== Byzantine Empire ======
- Byzantine–Sasanian War: Emperor Heraclius advances with an expeditionary force (40,000 men) along the Araxes River, destroying the fortress city of Dvin, capital of Armenia, and Nakhchivan (modern Azerbaijan). At Ganzak, Heraclius defeats the Persian army and destroys the famous fire temple at Takht-e Soleymān, an important Zoroastrian shrine. He winters his army in Caucasian Albania to gather forces for the next year.
- Winter – King Khosrow II withdraws most of his troops from Chalcedon (Anatolia); he assembles three armies to trap and destroy Heraclius' forces.

====== Europe ======
- The Visigoths under King Suintila recapture the Byzantine territories of Spania (Andalusia), after 70 years of occupation. Only the Balearic Islands stay a part of the Byzantine Empire.

====== Britain ======
- Eorpwald succeeds his father Rædwald, as king (bretwalda) of the independent Kingdom of East Anglia (approximate date). Raedwald is regarded as the most likely occupant of the Sutton Hoo ship-burial which contains the Sutton Hoo helmet.

====== Asia ======
- The Yiwen Leiju encyclopedia is completed during the Tang dynasty, by the Chinese calligrapher Ouyang Xun.

=== 625 ===
==== By place ====
====== Byzantine Empire ======
- Byzantine–Sassanid War: Emperor Heraclius marches with his forces westward, through the mountains of Corduene. The Persians go into winter quarters nearby, but Heraclius attacks them at Tigranakert (Kingdom of Armenia), routing the forces of the generals Shahin Vahmanzadegan and Shahraplakan. In less than seven days, he bypasses Mount Ararat and captures the strategic fortresses of Amida along the Arsanias River, and Martyropolis on the upper Tigris. The Persian army in northern Mesopotamia withdraws westward across the Euphrates. Heraclius pursues into Cilicia, accompanied by a great train of booty.
- Battle of Sarus: Heraclius is victorious in a Byzantine assault river crossing. The reinforced Persians under Shahrbaraz are defeated along the Sarus River, near Adana (modern Turkey). Heraclius recaptures Cappadocia and Pontus, and returns to Trapezus to spend the winter. Shahrbaraz retreats in good order, and is able to continue his advance through Asia Minor towards Constantinople.

====== Britain ======
- King Edwin of Northumbria marries Æthelburga of Kent. As a Christian, she brings her personal chaplain, Paulinus, and encourages her husband to convert to Christianity.
- King Cadfan of Gwynedd dies and is buried at Llangadwaladr, where his memorial stone can still be seen. He is succeeded by his son Cadwallon (approximate date).
- Judicaël becomes high king of Domnonée (northern Brittany).

====== Asia ======
- King Pulakeshin II of Chalukya receives Persian envoys, who are sent by King Khosrau II at Badami (southern India).

==== By topic ====
====== Religion ======
- March 19 – Battle of Uhud: Muhammad retreats against the inhabitants of Mecca (Saudi Arabia), which they consider a victory.
- October 25 – Pope Boniface V dies at Rome after a 6-year reign. He is succeeded by Honorius I as the 70th pope.

=== 626 ===
==== By place ====
====== Byzantine Empire ======
- Siege of Constantinople: A horde of Avars, consisting of about 80,000 men (including large contingents of Slavs, Bulgars, and other "barbarians"), attack the walls of Constantinople. A small Persian army arrives on the Bosphorus, on the Asiatic side. The Theodosian Walls are stormed with the most up-to-date siege equipment, in the form of traction trebuchets. The Avars also have mobile armoured shelters (medieval 'sows') and siege towers; the latter are covered in hides for fire protection. The defense of the capital (12,000 well-trained Byzantine troops) is in the hands of Patriarch Sergius I and Bonus (magister militum).
- July 31 – The Avars and Persian allies under Shahrbaraz launch an attack along the entire length of the Theodosian Walls (about 5.7 kilometres); the main effort is concentrated against the central section, particularly the low-lying mesoteichion. After a fierce infantry battle on the walls, the Byzantine army holds off many assaults on the city. Emperor Heraclius makes arrangements for a new army under his brother Theodore to operate against the Persians in western Anatolia, while he returns to his own army in Pontus.
- August 7 – In the waters of the Golden Horn, the Persian fleet is destroyed while ferrying reinforcements. The Avars, having suffered terrible losses, running short of food and supplies, burn their siege engines. They abandon the siege and retreat to the Balkan Peninsula. The Byzantines achieve a decisive victory at Blachernae, under the protection of the Church of the Virgin Mary.
- Byzantine–Persian War: Heraclius, his army reduced by campaigning to less than 30,000 men, is on the defensive in Pontus. Apparently he leaves a strong Byzantine garrison in Trapezus, and withdraws north-eastward along the Black Sea into Colchis, where he halts the Persians by aggressive defensive-offensive operations along the Phasis River. By attracting the Persian army under Shahin Vahmanzadegan in Anatolia, he provides Theodore with the opportunity to defeat them. By the end of the summer he threatens the communication of the Persians at Chalcedon (modern Turkey).
- Heraclius invites the Croats, a Slavic tribe living in Galicia, Silesia, and Bohemia, to settle in Illyricum. They are given the land between the Drava River and the Adriatic Sea for ridding of Avars. The Serbs are allowed to move from their homeland north of the Carpathians to a territory east of the Croats. Heraclius asks Pope Honorius I to send missionaries to both groups.
- Winter – Heraclius makes an alliance with Tong Yabghu Qaghan, ruler (khagan) of the Western Turkic Khaganate, for a joint invasion of the Persian Empire the following spring. He promises his daughter Eudoxia Epiphania, age 15, in marriage to Tong Yabghu and sends her under escort with wondrous gifts.

====== Europe ======
- Arioald succeeds his brother-in-law Adaloald as king of the Lombards, and afterwards goes insane. Arioald has his wife locked up in a monastery, accusing her of plotting against him with Grasulf II, duke of Friuli (northern Italy).

====== Britain ======
- King Edwin of Northumbria defeats the West Saxons under Cynegils, who has tried to thwart the growing strength of Edwin by having him assassinated. Edwin obliges Cynegils to acknowledge Northumbria's supremacy.
- April 19 – Eanflæd, daughter of Edwin of Northumbria, is born at a royal residence by the River Derwent. She is baptised by Paulinus, bishop of York.
- Edwin of Northumbria invades the Isle of Man and then Anglesey. King Cadwallon is defeated in battle, and is besieged on Puffin Island.
- Edinburgh (Scotland) is founded by Edwin of Northumbria (approximate date).
- Penda becomes king of Mercia (approximate date).

====== Persia ======
- Summer – King Khosrau II plans an all-out effort against Constantinople. He returns to Anatolia with two armies of unknown size, presumably more than 50,000 men each. One of these (possibly commanded by Khosrau himself) is to contain Heraclius in Pontus; another under Shahin Vahmanzadegan is defeated by Theodore.

====== Asia ======
- July 2 – Li Shimin travels to the Tang capital Chang'an to bid farewell to his younger brother Li Yuanji, who has been given command of a Chinese expedition against the Eastern Turkic Khaganate. Hearing of a plot to murder him, he and a few supporters seize the northern entrance to the emperor's palace. Li Shimin ambushes and eliminates his rival brothers Li Yuanji and Li Jiancheng, in the Xuanwu Gate Incident.
- September 4 – Emperor Gao Zu abdicates in favor of his son Li Shimin after an 8-year reign. He passes the throne to him (as Emperor Tai Zong).

=== 627 ===
==== By place ====
====== Byzantine Empire ======
- Spring – Byzantine–Sasanian War: Emperor Heraclius sweeps through southern Armenia with a 50,000-man expeditionary force, recapturing most of the Byzantine fortresses lost to the Persians ten and fifteen years earlier. The army of Shahrbaraz, still in Anatolia, is now cut off completely. Hearing from Byzantine agents (showing him letters) that King Khosrau II, dissatisfied with his failure to capture Constantinople, is planning to have him executed, he surrenders to Heraclius, refusing to join the Byzantine army against his ungrateful sovereign.
- Third Perso-Turkic War: The Göktürks and their Khazar allies (40,000 men) approach the Caspian Gates, and capture the Persian fortress at Derbent (modern Dagestan). Heraclius marches to the upper Tigris and invades the Persian heartland, leaving the Khazars under Tong Yabghu Qaghan to continue the siege of Tblilisi.
- December 12 – Battle of Nineveh: Heraclius crosses the Great Zab river and, in a feigned retreat, defeats the Persian army (12,000 men) under Rhahzadh, near the ruins of Nineveh (Iraq). Although wounded, Heraclius refuses to leave the battlefield, and in a final cavalry charge personally kills the Persian general.
- Winter – Heraclius plunders the city palace of Dastgerd (Iran) and gains tremendous riches (also recovering 300 captured Byzantine flags). He turns northeastward to Caucasian Albania to rest his army. Khosrau II flees to the mountains of Susiana, to rally support for the defense of the Persian capital Ctesiphon.

====== Britain ======
- King Eorpwald of East Anglia is murdered, and succeeded by Ricberht. He is a member of the East Anglian elite; during his rule paganism is re-established.
- April 12 – King Edwin of Northumbria is converted to Christianity by Bishop Paulinus of York, who previously saved his life.

====== Arabia ======
- March 31 – Battle of the Trench: Muhammad successfully withstands a siege for 27 days at Medina, by Meccan forces (10,000 men) under Abu Sufyan, whose allies, the Jewish tribe of Banu Qurayza, ultimately surrender to Muhammad.

==== By topic ====
====== Religion ======
- April 12 – Paulinus, last of the missionaries sent by Pope Gregory I, builds a wooden church in the old Roman legionary headquarters in York, and baptises Edwin of Northumbria as the first Christian king in northern England.
- Fourth Council of Mâcon: A council of Christian bishops approves the Monastic Rule of Saint Columbanus in the city of Mâcon (Burgundy).
- Cunibert is elected bishop of Cologne. Throughout his episcopacy, monasticism flourishes in Austrasia (approximate date).

====== Education ======
- St Peter's School, York, is founded by Paulinus.

=== 628 ===
==== By place ====
====== Byzantine Empire ======
- Spring – Byzantine–Sassanid War: Emperor Heraclius issues an ultimatum for peace to king Khosrau II, but he refuses his generous terms. The war-weary Persians revolt against Khosrau's regime at Ctesiphon and install his son Kavadh II to the throne. He puts his father to death and begins negotiations with Heraclius. Kavadh is forced to return all the territories conquered during the war. The Persians must give up all of the trophies they have captured, including the relic of the True Cross. Evidently there is also a large financial indemnity. Having accepted a peace agreement on his own terms, Heraclius returns in triumph to Constantinople.
- Third Perso-Turkic War: The Western Göktürks under their leader Tong Yabghu Qaghan plunder Tbilisi (modern Georgia). The Persian defenders are executed or mutilated, Tong Yabghu appoints governors (tuduns) to manage various tribes under his overlordship.

====== Britain ======
- Battle of Cirencester: King Penda of Mercia defeats the West Saxons at Cirencester (South West England) in what later will be Gloucestershire. After reaching an agreement, he takes control of the Severn Valley and the minor kingdom of the Hwicce.

====== Persia ======
- February 25 – Khosrau II, the last great king of the Sasanian Empire, is overthrown by his son Kavadh II.
- September 6 – Ardashir III, age 7, succeeds his father Kavadh II as the twenty-fourth king of the Sasanian Empire on the latter's death from plague.

====== Arabia ======
- Muhammad, Islamic prophet, leads about 1,400 men on a pilgrimage to Mecca where their passage is blocked. The Quraysh tribe and the Muslim community in Medina sign a 10 year truce (Treaty of Hudaybiyyah).

==== By topic ====
====== Arts and sciences ======
- Brahmagupta writes the Brāmasphuțasiddhānta, an early, yet very advanced, math book.

====== Education ======
- The Shariah enjoins women as well as men to obtain secular and religious educations. It forbids eating pork, domesticated donkey, and other flesh denied to Jews by Mosaic law (approximate date).

====== Religion ======
- Muhammad's letters to world leaders explain the principles of the new monotheistic Muslim faith, as they will be contained in his book, the Quran.

=== 629 ===
==== By place ====
====== Byzantine Empire ======
- September – Jerusalem is reconquered by the Byzantines (after 15 years of occupation), from the Persian Empire.
- September 14 – Emperor Heraclius enters Constantinople in triumph. In a ceremonial parade, accompanied by the True Cross, he is welcomed by the citizens and his son Heraclius Constantine.
- Heraclius styles himself as Basileus, Greek word for "sovereign", and takes the ancient title of "King of Kings", after his victory over Persia.

====== Europe ======
- King Chlothar II dies after a 16-year reign, and is succeeded by his son Dagobert I. Counseled by Bishop Arnulf of Metz and Pepin of Landen (Mayor of the Palace), he moves the capital to Paris.
- Charibert II, half-brother of Dagobert I, becomes king of Aquitaine (Southern France), and establishes his capital at Toulouse. Charibert's realm also includes Agen, Cahors, and Périgueux.

====== Britain ======
- Battle of Fid Eoin: King Connad Cerr of Dál Riata is killed by the Dál nAraidi of the over-kingdom of Ulaid in north-eastern Ireland (approximate date).

====== Arabia ======
- Summer – Muhammad, Islamic unifies all nomadic tribes of the Arabian Peninsula, converts them to Islam and prepares an expedition against the Jews.
- May–June – Battle of Khaybar: Muhammad and his followers defeat the Jews living in the fortified oasis at Khaybar, located 150 kilometers from Medina.
- September – Battle of Mu'tah: The Muslims fail to take the lands east of the Jordan River, and are pushed back near Mu'tah by the Ghassanids.

====== Asia ======
- April 27 – Shahrbaraz usurps the throne of the Sasanian Empire from Ardashir III, but is himself deposed forty days later by nobility in favour of Borandukht. Khosrow III briefly rules Khorasan in the confusion, until he is assassinated by the governor of the province.
- Winter – Emperor Taizong of the Tang dynasty launches a campaign against the Eastern Turkic Khaganate (Central Asia).
- Emperor Jomei succeeds his great aunt, empress Suiko, and ascends to the throne of Japan.

====== Americas ======
- The Maya military outpost of Dos Pilas (Guatemala) is founded, in order to control trade routes in the Petexbatún region. Bʼalaj Chan Kʼawiil is installed as its leader by his father, K'inich Muwaan Jol II, the ruler of Tikal.

==== By topic ====
====== Religion ======
- Xuanzang, Chinese Buddhist monk, sets out for India from the Tang dynasty capital Chang'an on a pilgrimage.
- Muhammad meets Al-Khansa', Arabic poet, and converts her to Islam.

== Births ==
620

- Li Tai, prince of the Tang dynasty (d. 652)
- Cedd, bishop of London (approximate date)

621

- Ardashir III, king of the Persian Empire (d. 629)
- Gertrude of Nivelles, Frankish abbess (d. 659)
- Suraqah al-Bariqi, Arab poet (d. 698)

622

- Al-Mukhtar, Islamic revolutionary (d. 687)
- Bavo, Frankish nobleman and saint (d. 659)
- Mezezius, Byzantine usurper (d. 669)
- Uqba ibn Nafi, Arab general (d. 683)
- Xue Yuanchao, official of the Tang dynasty (d. 683)

623

- March 28 – Marwan I, Muslim Caliph (d. 685)

624

- February 17 – Wu Zetian, Empress of the Zhou dynasty (d. 705)
- May – Abd Allah ibn al-Zubayr, Arab sahabi (d. 692)
- Hasan ibn Ali, second Shia Imam and grandson of Muhammad (d. 670)
- Yazdegerd III, king of the Persian Empire (d. 651)
- Approximate date – Adomnán, Irish abbot and hagiographer (d. 704)

625

- Hasan ibn Ali, grandson of Muhammad (d. 670)
- Œthelwald, king of Deira (approximate date)
- Theodo II, duke of Bavaria (approximate date)
- Zhang Jianzhi, official of the Tang dynasty (d. 706)

626

- April 19 – Eanflæd, queen of Northumbria
- Balthild, queen of the Franks (approximate date)
- Heraklonas, Byzantine emperor (d. 641)
- Husayn ibn Ali, grandson of Muhammad and the third Shi'a Imam (d. 680)
- Munmu, king of Silla (d. 681)
- Tenji, emperor of Japan (d. 672)
- Zaynab bint Ali, granddaughter of Muhammad and member of Ahl al-Bayt
- Abdallah ibn Amir

627

- Cui Zhiwen, Tang dynasty official (d. 683)

628

- Adomnán, Irish abbot and hagiographer (d. 704)
- Benedict Biscop, Anglo-Saxon abbot (d. 690)
- Gao Zong, emperor of the Tang dynasty (d. 683)
- John Maron, Syriac monk and patriarch (d. 707)

629

- Dōshō, Japanese Buddhist monk (d. 700)

== Deaths ==
620

- Chuluo Khan, ruler of the Eastern Turkic Khaganate
- Eleutherius, Byzantine exarch of Ravenna
- Shen Faxing, official of the Sui dynasty

approximate date:

- Basolus, Frankish missionary
- Imerius of Immertal, Swiss monk
- John the Merciful, Patriarch of Alexandria
- Mirin, Irish monk and missionary
- Seanach Garbh, Irish abbot

621

- November 15 – Malo, Welsh bishop
- Dou Jiande, general of the Sui dynasty (b. 573)
- Dou Kang, general of the Sui dynasty
- Reccared II, king of the Visigoths
- Sisebut, king of the Visigoths
- Wang Shichong, general of the Sui dynasty
- Xiao Xian, prince of the Liang dynasty (b. 583)
- Zhu Can, rebel leader during the Sui dynasty

622

- April 8 – Shōtoku, prince and regent of Japan (b. 574)
- April 11 – Luo Shixin, Tang dynasty general
- Andronicus, Coptic Orthodox Patriarch of Alexandria
- Colmán mac Cobthaig, king of Connacht (Ireland)
- John of Biclaro, Visigoth chronicler (approximate date)
- Li Zitong, rebel leader during the Sui dynasty
- Lin Shihong, rebel leader during the Sui dynasty
- Liu Wuzhou, rebel leader during the Sui dynasty
- Yin Kaishan, Tang dynasty general
- Walid ibn al-Mughirah, chief of the Banu Makhzum clan of the Quraysh tribe.

623

- Jizang, Chinese Buddhist monk (b. 549)
- Liu Heita, rebel leader during the Tang dynasty
- Lupus of Sens, French bishop (approximate date)
- Pingyang, princess of the Tang dynasty (b. 598)
- Su Wei, high official of the Sui dynasty (b. 542)
- Xu Yuanlang, rebel leader during the Sui dynasty

624

- March 17 – Amr ibn Hishām, Arab polytheist
- April 24 – Mellitus, Archbishop of Canterbury
- Abū Lahab, uncle of Muhammad (approximate date)
- Du Fuwei, rebel leader during the Sui dynasty (b. 598)
- Fu Gongshi, rebel leader during the Sui dynasty
- Gao Kaidao, rebel leader during the Sui dynasty
- Rædwald, king of East Anglia (approximate date)
- Ruqayyah, daughter of Muhammad (approximate date)
- Umayyah ibn Khalaf, clan leader of the Quraysh
- Utbah ibn Rabi'ah, clan leader of the Quraysh

625

- October 25 – Pope Boniface V
- Abd-Allah ibn Jahsh, Arab sahabah
- Hamza ibn Abd al-Muttalib, Arab sahabah
- Cadfan ap Iago, king of Gwynedd

626

- June 19 – Soga no Umako, leader of the Soga clan
- July 2 – Li Jiancheng, prince of the Tang dynasty (b. 589)
- July 2 – Li Yuanji, prince of the Tang dynasty (b. 603)
- Adaloald, king of the Lombards (approximate date)
- Cearl, king of Mercia (approximate date)
- Fatimah bint Asad, mother of Ali ibn Abi Talib (b. 555)
- Fiachnae mac Báetáin, king of Dál nAraidi (Ireland)
- Gaugericus, bishop of Cambrai (approximate date)
- Sexred, king of Essex (approximate date)
- Shahin Vahmanzadegan, Persian general (approximate date)
- Warnachar II, Mayor of the Palace (approximate date)

627

- Amatus, Benedictine abbot and hermit
- Bonus, Byzantine general and regent
- Cathal mac Áedo, king of Cashel (Ireland)
- King Eorpwald of East Anglia (approximate date)
- Feng Deyi, chancellor of the Tang dynasty (b. 568)
- Luo Yi, official of the Sui dynasty
- Pei Ju, official of the Tang dynasty
- Rhahzadh, Persian general
- Sichilde, Frankish queen
- King Stephen I of Iberia (Georgia)
- Zaynab bint Khuzayma, wife of Muhammad (b. 595)

628

- January 22 – Anastasius of Persia, monk
- Babai the Great, church father and theologian
- Du Yan, chancellor of the Tang dynasty
- February 28 – Khosrau II, king of the Persian Empire
- September 6 – Kavadh II, king of the Persian Empire
- June 3 – Liang Shidu, rebel leader
- Li Dashi, Chinese official and historian (b. 570)
- Shirin, wife of Khosrau II (approximate date)
- Suibne Menn, High King of Ireland
- April 15 – Suiko, empress of Japan
- Theodelinda, queen of the Lombards
- Tong Yabghu Qaghan, ruler of the Göktürks

629

- Chlothar II, king of the Franks
- Conall mac Máele Dúib, king of Uí Maine (Ireland)
- Connad Cerr, king of Dál Riata (Scotland)
- Eochaid Buide, king of Dál Riata
- Eustace of Luxeuil, Frankish abbot
- Jafar ibn Abi Talib, companion of Muhammad and older brother of Ali ibn Abi Talib
- Pei Ji, chancellor of the Tang dynasty (b. 570)
- Kinana ibn al-Rabi, Jewish leader
