= 624 =

Calendar year

624 in various calendars
Gregorian calendar	624; DCXXIV
Ab urbe condita	1377
Armenian calendar	73; ԹՎ ՀԳ
Assyrian calendar	5374
Balinese saka calendar	545–546
Bengali calendar	30–31
Berber calendar	1574
Buddhist calendar	1168
Burmese calendar	−14
Byzantine calendar	6132–6133
Chinese calendar	癸未年 (Water Goat); 3321 or 3114 — to — 甲申年 (Wood Monkey); 3322 or 3115
Coptic calendar	340–341
Discordian calendar	1790
Ethiopian calendar	616–617
Hebrew calendar	4384–4385
- Hindu calendars
Vikram Samvat	680–681
Shaka Samvat	545–546
Kali Yuga	3724–3725
Holocene calendar	10624
Iranian calendar	2–3
Islamic calendar	2–3
Japanese calendar	N/A
Javanese calendar	514–515
Julian calendar	624; DCXXIV
Korean calendar	2957
Minguo calendar	1288 before ROC 民前1288年
Nanakshahi calendar	−844
Seleucid era	935/936 AG
Thai solar calendar	1166–1167
Tibetan calendar	ཆུ་མོ་ལུག་ལོ་ (female Water-Sheep); 750 or 369 or −403 — to — ཤིང་ཕོ་སྤྲེ་ལོ་ (male Wood-Monkey); 751 or 370 or −402

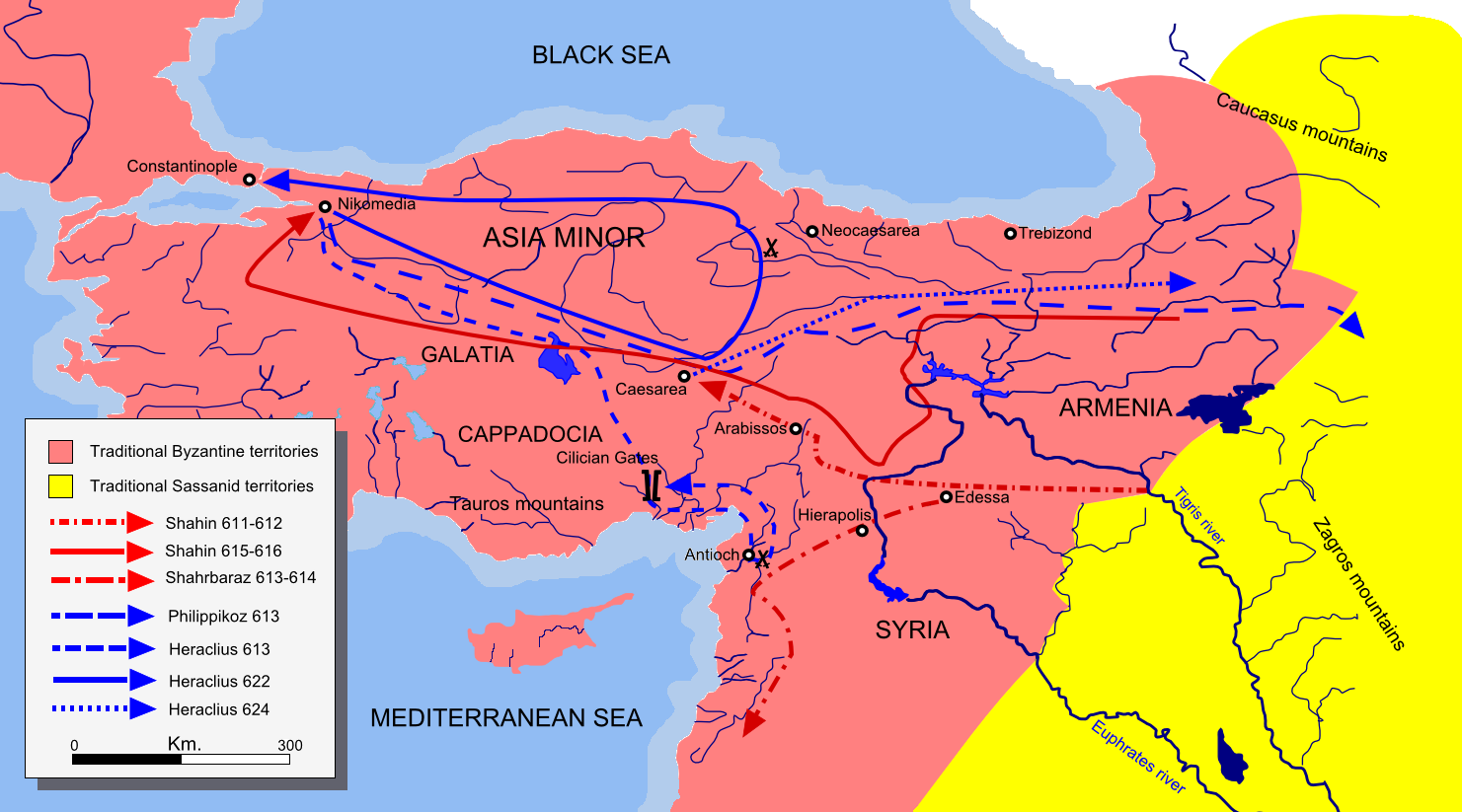
April 15:Campaign of Heraclius in Anatolia and Armenia begins

Year 624 (DCXXIV) was a leap year starting on Sunday of the Julian calendar. The denomination 624 for this year has been used since the early medieval period, when the Anno Domini calendar era became the prevalent method in Europe for naming years.

== Events ==
=== By date ===
==== January–June ====
- January 26 – (29 Rajab 2 AH) The Raid on Nakhla, the first successful raid the Muslims of Medina, against the Quraysh tribe in Mecca, is carried out by Abd Allah ibn Jahsh, who leads the plunder of a caravan of supplies.
- February 11 – While praying in the Masjid al-Qiblatayn in Medina, the Islamic prophet Muhammad receives revelations from God on the qibla, the direction of prayer, that he should be facing Mecca rather than Jerusalem during prayer, beginning an Islamic tradition.
- February – Chinese General Li Daliang leads an army to retake the Yu prefecture, near Xuancheng in what is now the Anhui province, from the rebel leader Fu Gongshi.
- March 13 – (17 Ramadah 2 AH) The Battle of Badr takes place in what is now Saudi Arabia as Muhammad and some 300 of his followers from Medina surprise a reinforced Meccan caravan at Badr (modern-day Saudi Arabia) returning from Syria, and defeat about 1,000 Quraysh from Mecca. After having heard that clan leader Abu Sufyan is escorting a rich trade caravan, Muhammad has the wells along its route (southwest of Medina) filled with sand in order to lure him into battle.
- March 25 – Heraclius, Emperor of Byzantium, departs from his capital at Constantinople (now Istanbul in Turkey) with his wife, the Empress Martina, and two of his children, and does not return for more than four years.
- April 9 – (15 Shawwal 2 AH) The Siege of Banu Qaynuqa is started by the Muslims in what is now Yathrib in Saudi Arabia, four days after Ghalib ibn Abd Allah al-Laythi is dispatched by Muhammad.
- April 15 – Emperor Haraclius celebrates Easter at Nicomedia (now İzmit) then travels to Caesarea (now Kayseri), proceeding during April to Theodosiopolis. He leads troops into Armenia and sacks its capital, Dvin.
- April 20 – (27th day of the 3rd month of the 6th year of the Wu'de era) Du Fuwei, a Chinese prince who rebelled against Sui dynasty China and then was rewarded with the title "Prince of Wu" by Emperor Gaozu of Tang, dies suddenly of poisoning, under suspicion that he has been ordered killed by the Emperor.
- April 20 – Heraclius invades the Sassanid Empire (now Iran).
- April 24 – St. Justus is appointed as the new Archbishop of Canterbury by Pope Boniface V upon the death of Archbishop Mellitus., receiving the pallium — symbol of the jurisdiction entrusted to archbishops. He oversees the dispatch of missionaries to Northumbria in northern England to convert the Anglo-Saxons to Christianity.
- June 23 – While at Ganzak at what is now northwest Iran, the Sassanid Emperor Khosrow II (Chosroes) is informed by soldiers who had escaped capture that Emperor Heraclius of Byzantium is preparing a surprise attack. Khosrow dispatches an envoy to inform General Shahrbaraz to abandon a campaign in Asia Minor and to accompany him to face Heraclius.
- June – (Dhu al-Hijjah AH 2) The Invasion of Sawiq is carried out against the Muslims by the Quraysh leader, Abu Sufyan ibn Harb.

==== July–December ====
- August 12 – The Army of the Eastern Turkic Khaganate, led by Illig Qaghan, clashes with the army of Tang dynasty China, led by Taizong, Prince of Qin and son of Emperor Gaozu, with fighting taking place west of Binzhou in what is now the Shandong province.
- August – Upon the death of Khunays ibn Hudhafa, a companion of Muhammad, Khunays's widow Hafsa bint Umar becomes eligible to marry Muhammad.
- November 11 – (9th B'ak'tun, 9th K'atun,9th year, 12th month, 3rd day) In what is now Guatemala, a stele is carved to honor a victory in battle by Kʼinich Yoʼnal Ahk I, the Mayan ruler of Piedras Negras
- November –
  - Zayd ibn Haritha, the Sahabi and military commander for Muhammad is sent on an expedition to Dhat Irq near Mecca. He then carries out the Al-Qarada raid of a caravan of Meccan merchants after discovering their trade route and captures more that 100,000 dirhams worth of goods
- December 21 – A group of 1,000 Muslims from Mecca, led by Abu Sufyan ibn Harb, sets out from Mecca to capture Medina, defended by the Banu Khazraj tribe, led by Abd Allah ibn Ubayy. The two forces will fight combat three months later, on March 23, 625, at the Battle of Uhud.

=== By place ===
==== Byzantine Empire ====
- Byzantine–Sasanian War: Emperor Heraclius advances with an expeditionary force (40,000 men) along the Araxes River, destroying the fortress city of Dvin, capital of Armenia, and Nakhchivan (modern Azerbaijan). At Ganzak, Heraclius defeats the Persian army and destroys the famous fire temple at Takht-e Soleymān, an important Zoroastrian shrine. He winters his army in Caucasian Albania to gather forces for the next year.
- Winter – King Khosrow II withdraws most of his troops from Chalcedon (Anatolia); he assembles three armies to trap and destroy Heraclius' forces.

==== Europe ====
- The Visigoths under King Suintila recapture the Byzantine territories of Spania (Andalusia), after 70 years of occupation. Only the Balearic Islands stay a part of the Byzantine Empire.

==== Britain ====
- Eorpwald succeeds his father Rædwald, as king (bretwalda) of the independent Kingdom of East Anglia (approximate date). Raedwald is regarded as the most likely occupant of the Sutton Hoo ship-burial which contains the Sutton Hoo helmet.

==== Asia ====
- The Yiwen Leiju encyclopedia is completed during the Tang dynasty, by the Chinese calligrapher Ouyang Xun.

== Births ==
- February 17 – Wu Zetian, Empress of the Zhou dynasty (d. 705)
- May – Abd Allah ibn al-Zubayr, Arab sahabi (d. 692)
- Hasan ibn Ali, second Shia Imam and grandson of Muhammad (d. 670)
- Yazdegerd III, king of the Persian Empire (d. 651)
- Approximate date – Adomnán, Irish abbot and hagiographer (d. 704)

== Deaths ==
- March 17 – Amr ibn Hishām, Arab polytheist
- April 24 – Mellitus, Archbishop of Canterbury
- Abū Lahab, uncle of Muhammad (approximate date)
- Du Fuwei, rebel leader during the Sui dynasty (b. 598)
- Fu Gongshi, rebel leader during the Sui dynasty
- Gao Kaidao, rebel leader during the Sui dynasty
- Rædwald, king of East Anglia (approximate date)
- Ruqayyah, daughter of Muhammad (approximate date)
- Umayyah ibn Khalaf, clan leader of the Quraysh
- Utbah ibn Rabi'ah, clan leader of the Quraysh
