= Yankang =

Yankang (延康) was a Chinese era name used by several emperors of China. It may refer to:

- Yankang (220), era name used by Emperor Xian of Han
- Yankang (619–620), era name used by Shen Faxing
- Yankang, brand name used by Qingdao Yankang Plastic Machinery Co., Ltd
