= Cen Wenben =

Chinese official

Cen Wenben 岑文本
- Born: 595; Xinye County, Henan
- Died: May 10, 645 (aged 49–50); Beijing
- Other names: Jingren (景仁); Viscount Xian of Jiangling (江陵憲子)
- Occupations: Historian, politician
- Children: Cen Manqian; Cen Jingqian
- Relatives: Cen Changqian (nephew)

Cen Wenben (595 – May 10, 645), courtesy name Jingren, posthumously known as Viscount Xian of Jiangling, was a Chinese historian and politician who served as a chancellor during the reign of Emperor Taizong in the Tang dynasty. He was an assistant editor of the Book of Zhou, the official history of the Northern Zhou dynasty, last dynasty of the Northern dynasties.

== Background ==
Cen Wenben was born in 595 during the reign of Emperor Wen in the Sui dynasty. His grandfather, Cen Shanfang (岑善方), served under Emperor Xuan of Western Liang, a vassal of the Northern Zhou state who claimed to be the legitimate emperor and successor of the Liang dynasty. His father, Cen Zhixiang (岑之象), served as a magistrate of Handan County late in the Sui dynasty. In 608, Cen Zhixiang was falsely accused of crimes. Cen Wenben, who was already talented in writing and was calm and dexterous in his actions, went to the ministry of justice to proclaim his father's innocence and, when questioned, was able to answer and explain clearly. The officials were surprised by his ability to do so despite his young age, and, to test his writing ability, asked him to write an ode to lotus. Cen was able to write it well quickly. Subsequently, he was able to convince the officials that his father was falsely accused, allowing his father to be exculpated. He became famous from the incident. He was subsequently recommended for the imperial examination by the local government of his home commandery, but as by that time, most of Sui territory was engulfed in agrarian rebellions against Emperor Yang, Cen Wenben did not report for the examination.

== Service under Xiao Xian and Li Xiaogong ==
In 617, Xiao Xian, a great-grandson of Emperor Xuan of Western Liang, whom Cen Wenben's grandfather Cen Shanfang had served, rose in rebellion, claiming to restore the Liang dynasty. Xiao Xi established his capital at Jiangling (江陵, in modern Jingzhou, Hubei), and he summoned Cen Wenben to serve as Zhongshu Shilang (中書侍郎), the deputy head of the legislative bureau of government (中書省, Zhongshu Sheng). Cen was in charge of writing the imperial edicts. In 621, when the Tang dynasty general Li Xiaogong (a nephew of Emperor Gaozu, the founding emperor of the Tang dynasty) attacked Liang and put Jiangling under siege, Cen suggested to Xiao Xi that he should surrender, and Xiao Xi did so. After Xiao Xi's surrender, however, Li Xiaogong's subordinates wanted to pillage the city. Cen persuaded Li Xiaogong that it would be wrong to do so, and Li Xiaogong subsequently ordered against pillaging. As Li Xiaogong was then put in charge of the former Liang capital, he invited Cen to serve on his staff. In 623, when Emperor Gaozu sent Li Xiaogong to attack the rebel leader Fu Gongshi, Cen followed Li Xiaogong and was in charge of his military correspondences. After Li Xiaogong defeated and killed Fu Gongshi and was put in charge of Fu's capital Danyang (丹楊, in modern Nanjing, Jiangsu), Cen continued to serve on Li Xiaogong's staff.

== During Emperor Taizong's reign ==
Cen Wenben's activities for the several following years were not recorded in history. By 627, when Emperor Gaozu's son, Emperor Taizong, was emperor, he was a lowly-ranked secretary at the Palace Library but also served as a junior official at the legislative bureau. On one occasion when Emperor Taizong carried out a field-tilling ceremony (to show ceremonial attention to farming), Cen wrote an ode to field-tilling, and on one New Year's Day when Emperor Taizong summoned the imperial officials to a feast, Cen wrote an ode to New Year's Day. The odes were considered beautifully written, and Cen became famous from them. The general Li Jing (who had at one point served as Li Xiaogong's assistant) also recommended him. He was promoted to a mid-level post in the legislative bureau and became more well regarded by Emperor Taizong. After Yan Shigu, the official who was largely responsible for drafting imperial edicts during the reign of Emperor Gaozu, was dismissed around that time, the chancellor Wen Yanbo, the head of the legislative bureau, stated to Emperor Taizong that no one was capable as drafting imperial edicts as Yan and sought to have Yan reinstated. Emperor Taizong instead responded, "I have someone else in mind; you, Duke, need not worry." He then made Cen the deputy head of the legislative bureau and made Cen in charge of drafting imperial edicts. At that time, Cen was also assisting Linghu Defen in compiling the official history of the Northern Zhou state, the Book of Zhou. It was said that most of the commentaries on the biographies were written by Cen. After the work was completed in 636, Emperor Taizong created Cen the Viscount of Jiangling. In 637, when Emperor Taizong visited the eastern capital Luoyang, there were heavy floods of rivers near Luoyang, and Cen took this opportunity to submit a secret petition urging Emperor Taizong to reduce his travel out of the capital. He also pointed out that too many construction projects were being carried out on behalf of Emperor Taizong's favorite son, Li Tai (the Prince of Wei)—that such expenditures will breed further expenditures. Emperor Taizong was pleased with Cen's petitions and awarded him with silk. In 642, Cen was given the additional designation of Zhuanzhang Jimi (專掌機密)—considered a chancellor de facto designation. It was said that Cen was humble and, despite his honorable status, he always greeted those who had known, no matter how minor that person's position was.

In 643, when Emperor Taizong's crown prince, Li Chengqian, was deposed after he was discovered to have plotted to overthrow his father, Cen and Liu Ji suggested that Emperor Taizong create Li Tai crown prince, but Emperor Taizong subsequently created another son, Li Zhi (the Prince of Jin) crown prince, believing that Li Tai's machinations was responsible for Li Chengqian's downfall. Emperor Taizong made many high-level officials carry additional titles as Li Zhi's staff members, but when he tried to bestow such a title on Cen, Cen declined, stating that he wanted to concentrate on serving the emperor, although Emperor Taizong still had the crown prince meet with Cen every five days and treat him as a friend, not as a subordinate. In 644, when Emperor Taizong, at an imperial gathering, stated to his key officials their strengths and weaknesses, he spoke, with regard to Cen:

Cen Wenben is kind-hearted, and writes exquisitely. His logic and analysis are also enduring ones, and he will not fail my expectations.

In 645, Emperor Taizong was attacking Goguryeo. Cen followed him on the campaign and was deeply involved in the logistics—so much so that his energy was drained. Emperor Taizong saw that he was speaking in ways that were unusual for him, and became worried, stating, "Cen Wenben came on this campaign with me, but I am afraid he will not return with me." Cen soon grew ill and died in You Prefecture (幽州, roughly modern Beijing). He was buried near the tomb of Emperor Taizong's wife, Empress Zhangsun, where Emperor Taizong would eventually buried himself. His nephew Cen Changqian and grandson Cen Xi later also served as chancellors.

== Notes and references ==
- Old Book of Tang, vol. 70.
- New Book of Tang, vol. 102.
- Zizhi Tongjian, vols. 185, 189, 195, 196, 197.
