= Lin Shihong =

Chinese agrarian rebel and self-declared king (died 622)

- Reign: January 22, 617 – 622
- Died: 622
Full name
- Family name: Lín (林); Given name: Shìhóng (士弘)
Era name and dates
- Tàipíng (太平): January 22, 617 – 622
- Dynasty: Chǔ (楚)

Lin Shihong (林士弘) (died 622) was an agrarian rebel and self-declared king who rose against the rule of the Chinese Sui dynasty near the end of Emperor Yang's reign. For several years, he controlled most of modern Jiangxi and Guangdong, but was then under attack by others, gradually reduced to fighting a guerrilla war against the Tang dynasty. He died in 622, and his followers scattered.

== Initial uprising ==
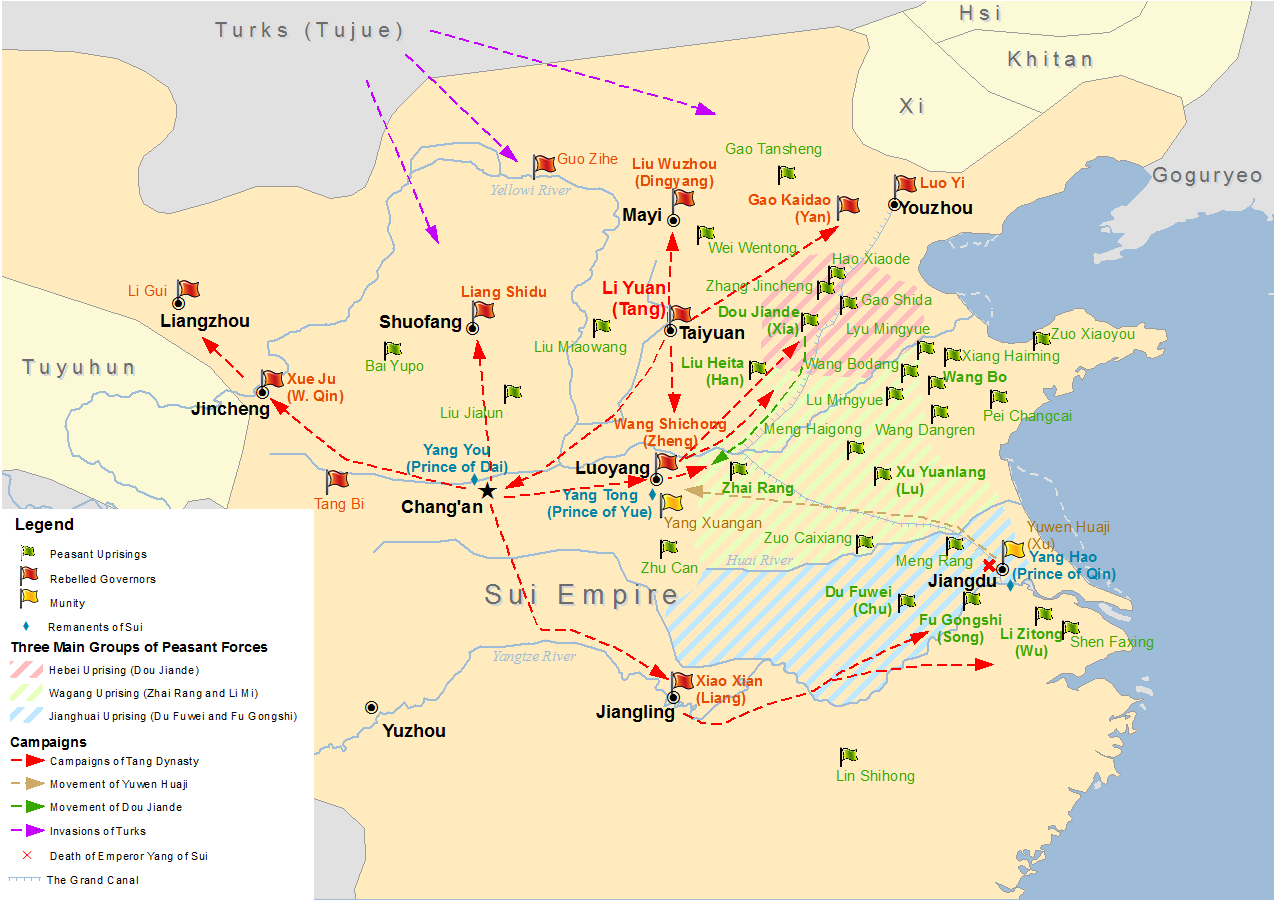
Map showing major uprisings and rebellions in the last years of Sui dynasty. Lin Shihong was a major rebel power in the south.

Virtually nothing is known about Lin Shihong's background, other than that he was from Rao Province (饒州, roughly modern Shangrao, Jiangxi). In 616, he followed an agrarian rebel from the same locale, Cao Shiqi (操師乞), in rising against Sui dynasty rule. Cao claimed the title of the Prince of Yuanxing and made Lin a major general. Later that year, Emperor Yang of Sui sent the official Liu Ziyi (劉子翊) to attack Cao, and Cao was killed by an arrow in battle. Lin took over Cao's troops and battled Liu at Lake Poyang, killing Liu in battle. Lin gained the allegiance of over 100,000 men. Around the new year 617, Lin claimed the title of Emperor of Chu, and he captured a number of commanderies in modern Jiangxi. It was said that the local gentry killed many of the Sui commandery governors and county magistrates to submit to him. By this point, his territory went as far north as Jiujiang (九江, in modern Jiujiang, Jiangxi) and as far as Panyu (番禺, in modern Guangzhou, Guangdong).

== Gradual loss of power ==
After that point on, however, territorial expansions by Lin Shihong were rarely mentioned in historical accounts; rather, contractions were mentioned. For example, around the new year 618, it was mentioned that Zhang Shan'an (張善安), a rebel leader from Fangyu (方與, in modern Xuzhou, Jiangsu), crossed the Yangtze River south to submit to Lin, but after Lin, not trusting his intentions, settled Zhang in outside his capital Yuzhang (豫章, in modern Nanchang, Jiangxi), Zhang became resentful and launched a surprise attack on Yuzhang, defeating Lin's forces and burning the exterior walls of Yuzhang, causing Lin to move his capital to Nankang (南康, in modern Ganzhou, Jiangxi). Subsequently, another rebel leader, Xiao Xian the Prince of Liang, sent his general Su Hu'er (蘇胡兒) to attack Yuzhang, capturing it, prompting Lin to further retreat to Yugan (餘干, in modern Shangrao).

In 618, the Sui official Feng Ang (馮盎), whose clan had controlled a number of commanderies in modern Guangdong and Hainan for several generations, submitted to Lin, although when Lin tried to persuade the Sui official Qiu He (丘和), who controlled modern northern Vietnam, to do the same, Qiu refused, and subsequently submitted to Xiao after hearing that Emperor Yang had been killed at Jiangdu (江都, in modern Yangzhou, Jiangsu) in a coup led by the general Yuwen Huaji. By late 620, it also appeared that Feng was no longer submitting to Lin, for he attacked and captured the rebel leaders Gao Facheng (高法澄) and Shen Baoche (沈寶徹), who had taken over Guang (廣州, roughly modern Guangzhou) and Xin (新州, roughly modern Yunfu, Guangdong) Prefectures respectively and submitted to Lin.

== Brief recovery and eventual dissipation ==
In 621, the Tang dynasty general Li Xiaogong destroyed Xiao Xian's state of Liang, seizing most of Liang territory and some of the troops, but much of the Liang troops fled and joined Lin, and Lin's military strength recovered. In fall 622, however, Feng officially submitted to Tang. Later that year, Lin sent his brother Lin Yaoshi (林藥師) the Prince of Poyang to attack Tang's Xun Prefecture (循州, roughly modern Huizhou, Guangdong), and the Tang prefect Yang Shilüe (楊世略) defeated and killed Lin Yaoshi. Further, the Chu general Wang Rong (王戎) then surrendered Nanchang Prefecture (南昌州, roughly modern Jiujiang). In fear, in winter 622, Lin offered to surrender to Tang, but soon regretted it, abandoning his capital Yugan and fled to Ancheng (安成, in modern Ji'an, Jiangxi), taking up positions in mountain caves, and the people of the region largely joined him. The Tang general Ruogan Ze (若干則) attacked him, however, and defeated him, but was unable to capture him. However, Lin soon died, and his followers scattered, ending his state of Chu.

== Notes ==
Regnal titles
Preceded by Emperor Yang of Sui	Emperor of China (Jiangxi/Guangdong/Hainan); 617–622	Succeeded by Emperor Gaozu of Tang
