= 598 =

Calendar year

598 in various calendars
- Gregorian calendar: 598; DXCVIII
- Ab urbe condita: 1351
- Armenian calendar: 47; ԹՎ ԽԷ
- Assyrian calendar: 5348
- Balinese saka calendar: 519–520
- Bengali calendar: 4–5
- Berber calendar: 1548
- Buddhist calendar: 1142
- Burmese calendar: −40
- Byzantine calendar: 6106–6107
- Chinese calendar: 丁巳年 (Fire Snake); 3295 or 3088 — to — 戊午年 (Earth Horse); 3296 or 3089
- Coptic calendar: 314–315
- Discordian calendar: 1764
- Ethiopian calendar: 590–591
- Hebrew calendar: 4358–4359
- Hindu calendars
- Vikram Samvat: 654–655
- Shaka Samvat: 519–520
- Kali Yuga: 3698–3699
- Holocene calendar: 10598
- Iranian calendar: 24 BP – 23 BP
- Islamic calendar: 25 BH – 24 BH
- Javanese calendar: 487–488
- Julian calendar: 598; DXCVIII
- Korean calendar: 2931
- Minguo calendar: 1314 before ROC 民前1314年
- Nanakshahi calendar: −870
- Seleucid era: 909/910 AG
- Thai solar calendar: 1140–1141
- Tibetan calendar: མེ་མོ་སྦྲུལ་ལོ་ (female Fire-Snake); 724 or 343 or −429 — to — ས་ཕོ་རྟ་ལོ་ (male Earth-Horse); 725 or 344 or −428

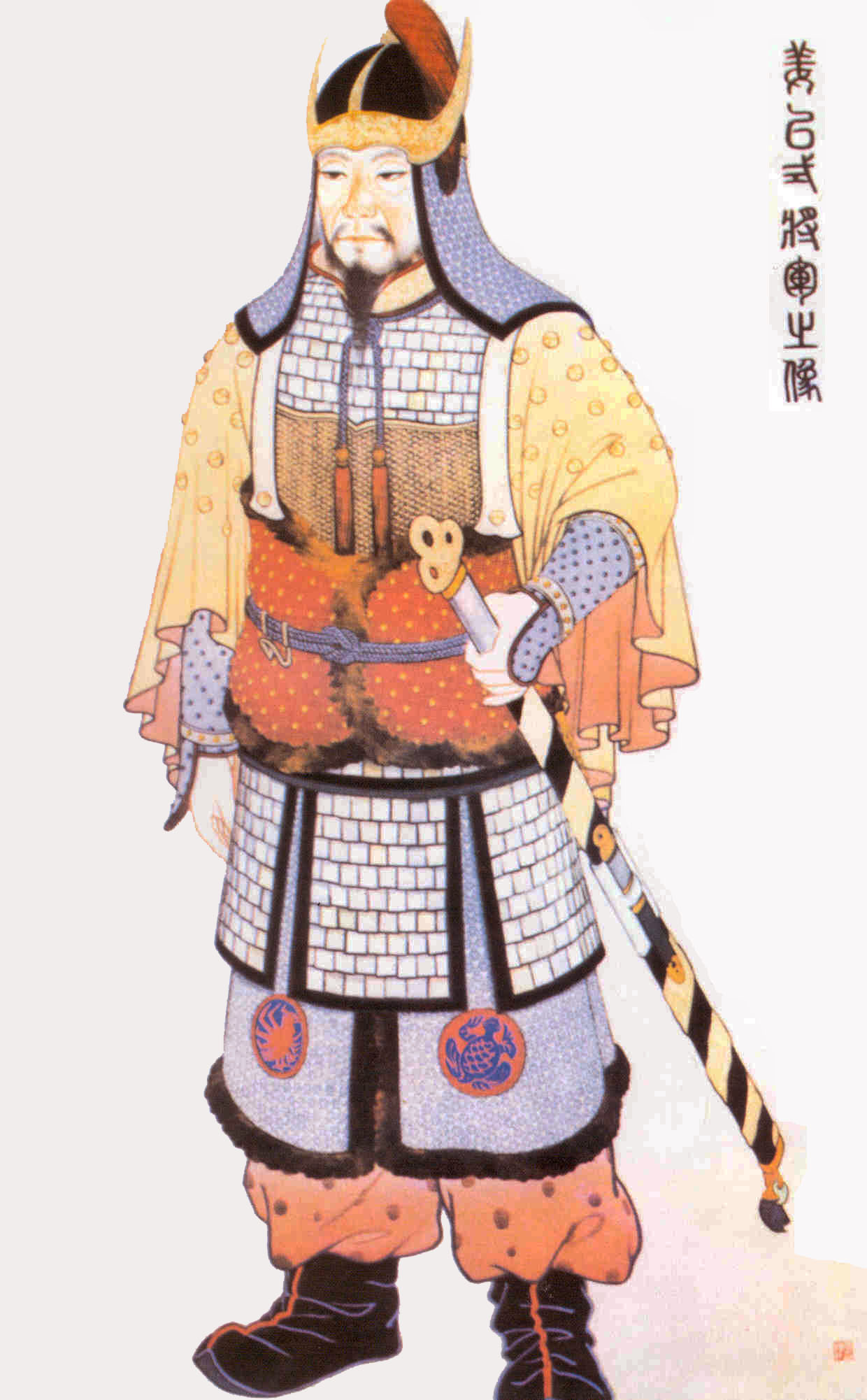
Admiral Kang I-sik of Goguryeo (Korea)

Year 598 (DXCVIII) was a common year starting on Wednesday of the Julian calendar. The denomination 598 for this year has been used since the early medieval period, when the Anno Domini calendar era became the prevalent method in Europe for naming years.

== Events ==
=== By place ===
==== Byzantine Empire ====
- March 30 – Balkan Campaign: The Avars lift the siege of the fortress city of Tomis (modern Romania). A Byzantine army under Comentiolus crosses the Balkan Mountains, and marches along the Danube River to Zikidiba.
- The Avars rout the Byzantine forces of Comentiolus (south of Haemus Mons), and capture Drizipera (Thrace). A large part of their troops are killed by the plague, after many cities are devastated in the Balkan Peninsula.
- Emperor Maurice pays tribute to the Avars and concludes a treaty with their leader Bayan I, allowing Byzantine expeditions in Wallachia. He reorganises his army and strengthens the Long Walls (west of Constantinople).

==== Europe ====
- Maurice makes peace with King Agilulf, conceding northern Italy. Pope Gregory I the Great negotiates a truce, ending 30 years of Lombard terror. Agilulf expands the Lombard Kingdom by occupying Sutri and Perugia.

==== Britain ====
- Battle of Catraeth: The Gododdin under Mynyddog Mwynfawr, Brythonic king of Hen Ogledd ("The Old North"), defeat the Angles of Bernicia and Deira, at the stronghold of Catraeth in Northern England (approximate date).

==== Asia ====
- August 4 – Goguryeo War: Emperor Wéndi orders his youngest son, Yang Liang (assisted by the co-prime minister Gao Jiong), to conquer Goguryeo (Korea) during the rainy season, with a Chinese army (300,000 men).
- The Chinese fleet engages in battle against the Goguryeo fleet (50,000 men) under Admiral Kang I-sik, and is destroyed in the Bohai Sea. During the invasion the Sui forces are all defeated, and Yang Liang is forced to retreat.
- King Yeongyang sends an embassy to Daxing; Wéndi accepts a peace agreement with Goguryeo. He claims a hollow victory, as the Sui dynasty lost nearly 90% of his army and navy during the disastrous campaign.
- Hye becomes king of the Korean kingdom of Baekje.

=== By topic ===
==== Religion ====
- Missionaries begin to convert the Anglo-Saxons to Christianity throughout much of what will later be the British Isles (approximate date).
- The Guoqing Temple is built on Mount Tiantai (Zhejiang), and becomes the site for the teachings of Chinese Buddhism.

== Births ==
- January 28 – Taizong, emperor of the Tang dynasty (d. 649)
- Dou Dexuan, high official of the Tang dynasty (d. 666)
- Du Fuwei, rebel leader during the Sui dynasty (d. 624)
- Pingyang, princess of the Tang dynasty (d. 623)
- Brahmagupta, Indian mathematician and astronomer (d. 668)
- Gomentrude, Frankish queen consort (fl. 630)

== Deaths ==
- Áed mac Ainmuirech, High King of Ireland
- Dallán Forgaill, Christian Irish poet
- Wideok, king of Baekje (Korea) (b. 525)
