= Xiao Xian =

Liang Di (梁帝)
Family name:	Xiao (蕭, xiāo)
Given name:	Xian (銑, xiǎn)
Posthumous name:	None

Xiao Xian (蕭銑) (583–621) was a descendant of the imperial house of the Chinese Liang dynasty, who rose against the rule of the Sui dynasty toward the end of the rule of Emperor Yang of Sui. He tried to revive Liang, and for several years appeared to be successful in doing so, as he, with his capital at Jiangling, ruled over a state that included most of modern Hubei, Hunan, Guangxi, and northern Vietnam. In 621, however, under an attack by the Tang dynasty generals Li Jing and Li Xiaogong, he, not realizing that relief forces were approaching Jiangling, surrendered. He was subsequently taken to the Tang capital Chang'an, where Emperor Gaozu of Tang executed him.

== Background ==
Xiao Xian was a great-grandson of Xiao Cha, Emperor Xuan of Western Liang and a vassal of Western Wei and Northern Zhou, who claimed the Liang imperial title under the support from those states with his capital at Jiangling. His throne passed for two more generations, to Emperor Jing (Xiao Cong), until it was abolished by Emperor Wen of Sui in 587. That year, Xiao Xian's grandfather and Emperor Jing's uncle Xiao Yan (蕭巖) the Prince of Anping and Emperor Jing's brother Xiao Huan (蕭瓛) the Prince of Yixing, believing that the Sui general Cui Hongdu (崔弘度) was about to launch a surprise attack on Jiangling with Emperor Jing away at the Sui capital Chang'an to pay homage to Emperor Wen, surrendered to the Chen dynasty with the people of Jiangling, an act that directly led to Emperor Wen's decision to abolish Western Liang notwithstanding Emperor Jing's submissiveness. In 589, after Emperor Wen conquered Chen, he largely spared Chen officials. However, Xiao Yan and Xiao Huan were executed after they were captured by Yuwen Shu.

As a result of Xiao Yan's death by execution, his family, unlike the rest of the Xiaos, was not treated well by Sui authorities. Xiao Xian himself was poor in his youth, supporting himself and his mother by serving as a scribe. He was known for being filially pious to his mother. During the reign of Emperor Yang, because Emperor Yang's wife Empress Xiao was a sister of Emperor Jing's, her relatives were generally given governmental offices, and Xiao Xian was made the county magistrate of Luochuan (羅川, in modern Yueyang, Hunan).

== Initial uprising ==
In 617, several military officers at Baling Commandery (巴陵, roughly modern Yueyang) considered rising against Sui rule. They initially wanted to support one of their own, Dong Jingzhen (董景珍) as leader, but Dong pointed out that he was of a humble lineage and would not be respected by others, but that Xiao Xian was of imperial heritage and would be supported. They therefore sent messengers to Luochuan to report this to Xiao, who then gathered several thousand men. At the same time, the agrarian rebel leader Shen Liusheng (沈柳生) was attacking Luochuan, and Xiao initially could not repel him. However, when Xiao, believing that the act would cause Shen to submit, declared himself the Duke of Liang and replaced all Sui uniforms with Liang ones, Shen submitted. Within five days of Xiao's declaration, he had several tens of thousands of men, and he led them to Baling. Dong sent one of his followers, Xu Deji (徐德基) to greet Xiao, when Shen, believing that his accomplishment would be overshadowed by the contributions of Dong and the others, killed Xu and wanted to detain Xiao. Xiao, in shock, offered to resign, which led Shen to, in fear, beg for forgiveness. Xiao initially pardoned him, but Dong argued that if Xiao did not kill Shen, he could not show the rule of law, and so Xiao changed his mind and allowed Dong to execute Shen. Shen's soldiers fled.

In winter 617, Xiao built a tall altar and burned a wooden pire thereon. He declared himself the Prince of Liang and changed era name to show independence from Sui.

== Reign ==
Map of the situation in northern China during the transition from the Sui to the Tang, with the main contenders for the throne and the main military operations

Around the new year 618, Xiao Xian sent his general Su Hu'er (蘇胡兒) to attack another rebel leader, Lin Shihong the Emperor of Chu, who had earlier taken over most of modern Jiangxi and Guangdong. Su captured Lin's major city Yuzhang (豫章, in modern Nanchang, Jiangxi), prompting Lin to retreat from Nankang (南康, in modern Ganzhou, Jiangxi) to Yugan (餘干, in modern Shangrao, Jiangxi).

In summer 618, Xiao took imperial title and established an imperial government with the Liang dynasty governmental structure. He posthumously honored Xiao Cong as Emperor Jing (as Xiao Cong had died with only the Sui title of Duke of Liang), but did not so posthumously honor his grandfather Xiao Yan and father Xiao Gui (蕭璿), honoring Xiao Yan only as Prince Zhonglie of Hejian and Xiao Gui as Prince Wenxian of Hejian. He created seven of his general's princes and sent one of them, Yang Daosheng (楊道生) the Prince of Song to attack Jiangling. After Yang captured Jiangling, Xiao moved his capital from Baling to Jiangling. Meanwhile, the Sui officials in the modern Guangxi and northern Vietnam regions, upon hearing that Emperor Yang had been killed in a coup led by the general Yuwen Huaji in spring 618, largely surrendered to Xiao. Historical records indicate that Xiao's territory went as far east as Jiujiang, as far west as the Three Gorges, as far south as Jiaozhi (交趾, modern Hanoi, Vietnam), and as far north as the Han River, with more than 400,000 regular soldiers under his disposal.

In 619, Xiao made a push to expand his territory to the modern Chongqing and Sichuan region, then held by the Tang dynasty. He sent Yang and Chen Puhuan (陳普環) to attack Tang's Xia Prefecture (峽州, roughly modern Yichang, Hubei), but they were repelled by the Tang general Xu Shao (許紹). In 620, the Tang general Li Xiaogong the Duke of Zhao Commandery attacked Xiao's general Du Ti (闍提) the Prince of Dongping and killed Du.

Meanwhile, Xiao was said to be narrow-minded and suspicious, and his generals, because of their accomplishments, were out of control and cruel. Xiao feared them, and therefore declared that his empire was peaceful and that the military should be cut back, in order to reduce the influences of the generals.

Meanwhile, in winter 620, Dong Jingzhen's brother, a general at Jiangling, was resentful of Xiao and plotted against him. When the news of the plot was leaked, Xiao executed Dong Jingzhen's brother. At that time, Dong was defending Changsha. Xiao declared a pardon for Dong and summoned him back to Jiangling, but Dong, in fear, rose against Xiao, offering to surrender Changsha to Tang. Emperor Gaozu ordered Xu to try to aid Dong, but Xu did not appear to be able to advance much, although he did capture Jingmen from Liang. Meanwhile, Xiao sent Zhang Xiu (張繡) the Prince of Qi to attack Changsha. Dong tried to get Zhang to join him, by pointing out the situation to be similar to when Emperor Gao of Han first killed Han Xin and then Peng Yue—i.e., the people with contributions were being killed. Zhang did not respond and put Changsha under siege. Dong tried to fight his way out of the siege but was killed by his own subordinates. Xiao promoted Zhang, and Zhang became arrogant due to his contributions. Xiao killed him, and thereafter, it was said that all of Liang's generals all considered rebelling, and that Liang's power was weakened.

== Defeat and death ==
Around the same time, the Tang official Li Jing had offered 10 strategies to destroy Liang to Li Xiaogong. Li Xiaogong relayed them to Emperor Gaozu, who accepted them. In spring 621, Emperor Gaozu made Li Xiaogong the commandant at Kui Prefecture (夔州, modern eastern Chongqing) and had him build a large fleet and train sailors to prepare for the attack against Liang. He also made Li Jing Li Xiaogong's deputy.

In summer 621, the Tang general Zhou Faming (周法明) attacked Liang's An Prefecture (安州, roughly modern Xiaogan, Hubei), capturing the Liang general Ma Guiqian (馬貴遷). Soon thereafter, the Tang general Guo Xingfang (郭行方) attacked Liang's Ruo Prefecture (鄀州, in modern Xiangfan, Hubei) and captured it as well.

In winter 621, Tang launched a major assault on Liang, with Li Xiaogong, assisted by Li Jing, in command of the forces overall. With Yangtze River's water high and treacherous at that time, Xiao did not expect an attack from Tang, and he was caught by surprise. Li Xiaogong defeated the Liang general Wen Shihong (文士弘) and approached Jiangling. As Xiao had earlier reduced his armed forces, he only had a few thousand men in Jiangling, and he issued emergency orders to the troops in the other parts of the empire, ordering them to come to Jiangling's aid at once. Nevertheless, Xiao's counterattack was initially successful, although Li Xiaogong and Li Jing soon defeated Liang forces again and put Jiangling under siege. Under Li Jing's suggestion, Li Xiaogong floated the captured Liang ships down the Yangtze River, empty, to confuse Liang forces into believing that Jiangling had fallen. The Liang forces were indeed confused and slowed down.

With Jiangling surrounded and Xiao's contact with the outside cut off, he, under suggestion by his official Cen Wenben, decided to surrender. He announced to his officials:

Heaven does not protect Liang, and we can no longer stand. If we fight all the way to being completely worn out before surrendering, it will be the people who suffer. Why do I put them in water and fire just because of myself?

After offering sacrifices to the Liang ancestors, Xiao surrendered, stating to Li Xiaogong, "Only Xiao Xian should die. The people are innocent. Please do not plunder." He did not know that more than 100,000 Liang soldiers were approaching, and after they arrived, they saw that Xiao had surrendered and surrendered as well.

Li Xiaogong delivered Xiao to Chang'an. Emperor Gaozu rebuked him. Xiao, not submitting to Emperor Gaozu's rebuke, responded:

Sui lost its deer, and the heroes sought after it. I, Xiao Xian, was not blessed by Heaven, and therefore was captured. I was merely like Tian Heng (田橫, a Qi prince who tried to revive Qi after the fall of the Qin dynasty) claiming a princely title, who did not rebel against the Han dynasty. If what I did is criminal, I am willing to be boiled to death.

Emperor Gaozu, angry at Xiao's refusal to submit, had him beheaded.

== Era name ==
- Fengming (鳳鳴 fèng míng) 617–621

== Notes ==
Regnal titles
Preceded by Emperor Yang of Sui	Emperor of China (Hubei/Hunan/Guangxi/Northern Vietnam); 617–621	Succeeded by Emperor Gaozu of Tang
