= Li Zitong =

Chinese agrarian rebel leader (died 622)

Wu Di (吳帝)
Family name:	Lǐ (李)
Given name:	Zǐtōng (子通)
Posthumous name:	None

Li Zitong (died 622 CE) was an agrarian leader who claimed the title of emperor of Wu in the aftermaths of the death of Emperor Yang of Sui at the hands of the general Yuwen Huaji in 618. After Yuwen vacated the city of Jiangdu (江都, in modern Yangzhou, Jiangsu), the region was in a state of confusion and, in 619, Li captured Jiangdu and declared a new state of Wu. In 620, he was defeated by the Tang dynasty general Li Fuwei and he headed south, defeating another rebel leader, Shen Faxing King of Liang and seizing Shen's territory (roughly, modern Zhejiang). In 621, however, Li Fuwei attacked him again and forced his surrender. He was taken to the Tang capital at Chang'an but was spared by Emperor Gaozu. In 622, believing that he could try to re-establish his state, he fled from Chang'an. He was captured and executed.

== Initial uprising ==
Li Zitong was from Donghai Commandery (東海, roughly modern Lianyungang, Jiangsu). He was said to be poor in his youth and supported himself by fishing and hunting. While living in the country, whenever he saw youngster bearing heavy burdens, he would bear the burdens for them. He was also said to be generous with the little he had, but vindictive, repaying every single slight. In or sometime before 615, with agrarian rebels rising against Sui dynasty rule, Li joined the rebel leader Zuo Caixiang (左才相), then at Changbai Mountain (長白山, in modern Binzhou, Shandong). At that time, the agrarian rebel leaders tended to be cruel, but Li was considered kind and tolerant, and therefore many people joined him. Within half a year, he gathered 10,000 men. Zuo began to be jealous and suspicious of him, and Li took his men and left in 615, heading south and crossing the Huai River to join another rebel leader, Du Fuwei. Soon thereafter, for reasons unknown, Li wanted to kill Du and set an ambush for him, but while Du was wounded, he was not killed. Li was then defeated by the Sui general Lai Zheng (來整) and fled to Hailing (海陵, in modern Taizhou, Jiangsu), gathering 20,000 men and claiming the title of general.

== Struggle for modern Jiangsu and Zhejiang ==
Li Zitong's activities for the next several years were not clear, other than that he continued to occupy Hailing. After Emperor Yang was killed in the spring of 618 at Jiangdu (江都, in modern Yangzhou, Jiangsu) in a coup led by the general Yuwen Huaji, Yuwen then left Jiangdu and Li contended for control of the lower Yangtze River region against Du Fuwei, Shen Faxing the King of Liang, and the former Sui general Chen Leng (陳稜). In the fall of 619, Li put Jiangdu, then controlled by Chen, under siege. Chen sought help from Shen and Du; Du led forces to relieve Chen personally while Shen sent his son Shen Guan (沈綸). Accepting the suggestion of his official Mao Wenshen (毛文深), Li tricked Du and Shen Guan into battling each other by launching an attack on Du with soldiers that pretended to be Shen's troops. Neither was then able to assist Chen, and Li soon captured Jiangdu. He claimed the title of Emperor of Wu once he did so.

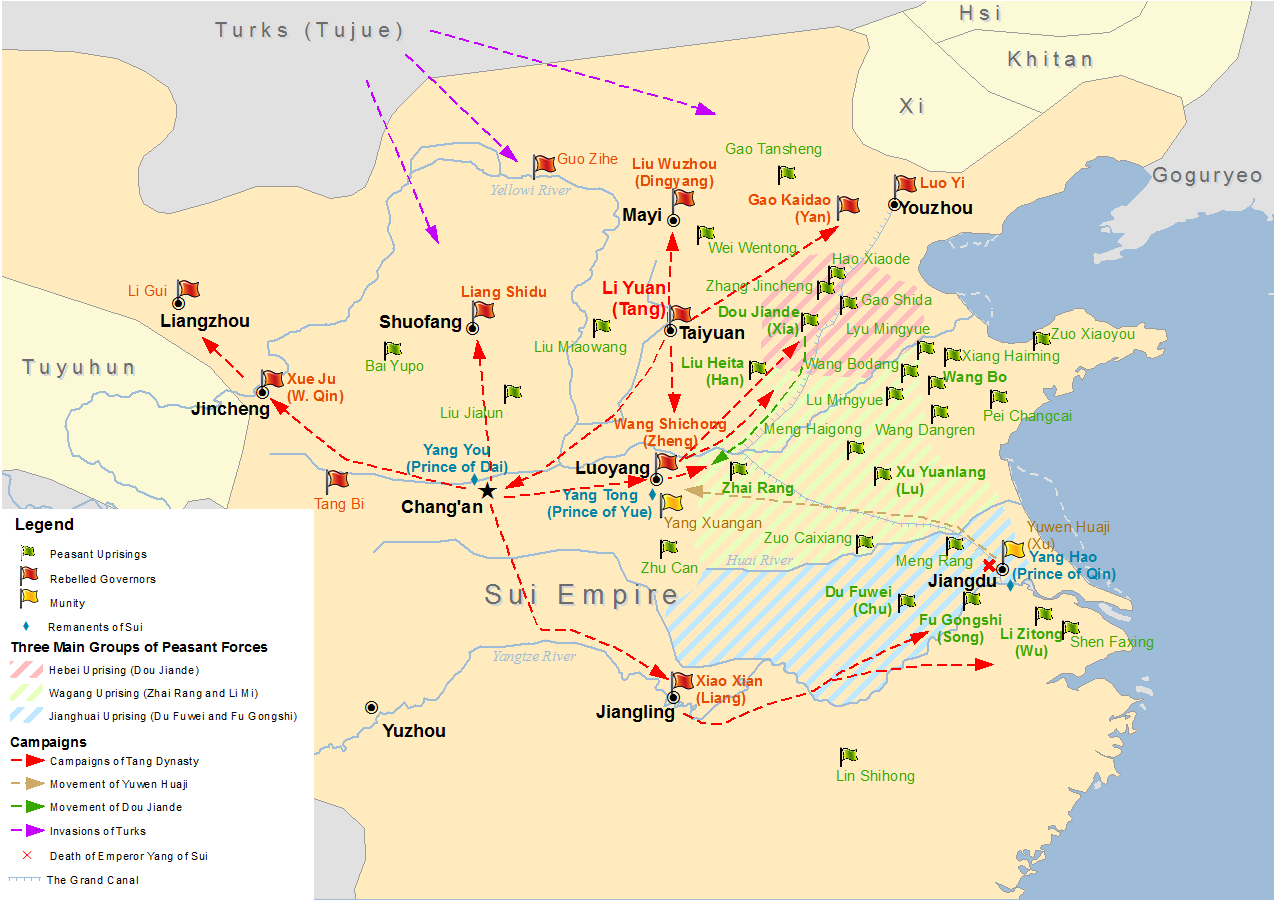
Map showing major uprisings and rebellions in the last years of the Sui dynasty. Li Zitong was a major power in the east.

In 620, Li crossed the Yangtze to attack Shen, who then had his capital at Piling (毗陵, in modern Changzhou, Jiangsu). Li quickly captured Jingkou (京口, in modern Zhenjiang, Jiangsu), and when Shen sent his general Jiang Yuanchao (蔣元超) against Li, Li defeated and killed Jiang. Shen abandoned Piling and fled to Wu Commandery (roughly modern Suzhou, Jiangsu), allowing Li to seize Piling and Danyang (丹楊, roughly modern Nanjing, Jiangsu). Meanwhile, Du Fuwei, who had by that point submitted to the Tang and was granted the imperial surname of Li by Emperor Gaozu and therefore was known as Li Fuwei, sent his generals Fu Gongshi, Kan Leng (闞稜), and Wang Xiongdan (王雄誕), against Li Zitong. After initial indecisive battles, Li Zitong was defeated, and after he ran out of food supplies, he abandoned Jiangdu, heading first to Jingkou, and then abandoned Jingkou as well and attacked Shen. Shen committed suicide, allowing Li Zitong to take over his territory—roughly modern Zhejiang. Li Zitong placed his capital at Yuhang (杭, in modern Hangzhou, Zhejiang). His own old territory and the territory that he had seized from Shen earlier that year, including Danyang and Jingkou, were seized by Li Fuwei.

== Defeat and death ==
In winter 621, Li Fuwei sent Wang Xiongdan against Li Zitong. Initially, Li Zitong placed his best troops at Dusong Mountain (獨松嶺, in modern Huzhou, Zhejiang), but after Wang pretended to have a much larger army than he actually had, Li Zitong panicked and took up defense at Hangzhou (杭州, also in modern Hangzhou), and was defeated by Wang. He surrendered, and Li Fuwei sent Li Zitong and his key official Le Botong (樂伯通) to the Tang capital Chang'an. For reasons unclear, Emperor Gaozu released Li Zitong from custody.

In fall 622, Li Fuwei, concerned that Tang might believe that he was not sufficiently submissive, went to Chang'an to pay homage to Emperor Gaozu. Emperor Gaozu promoted him in title and granted him the special honor of being seated even above his own son Li Yuanji the Prince of Qi, but did not allow him to return to Danyang. When Li Zitong heard this, he believed that with Li Fuwei not at Danyang, the region might be unsettled enough that if he were able to flee back to the region, he might be able to reestablish his state. He and Le therefore fled from Chang'an, but they were arrested at Lantian Pass (藍田關), not far from Chang'an, by the officials guarding the pass, and they were executed.

== Era name ==
- Míngzhèng (明政) 619-621

Regnal titles
Preceded by Yang Tong of Sui dynasty	Emperor of China (Central Jiangsu); 619–620	Succeeded by Emperor Gaozu of Tang
Preceded by Shen Faxing (King of Liang)	Emperor of China (Southern Jiangsu); 620	Succeeded by Emperor Gaozu of Tang
Preceded by Shen Faxing (King of Liang)	Emperor of China (Zhejiang); 620–621	Succeeded by Emperor Gaozu of Tang
