= 692 =

Calendar year

692 in various calendars
Gregorian calendar	692; DCXCII
Ab urbe condita	1445
Armenian calendar	141; ԹՎ ՃԽԱ
Assyrian calendar	5442
Balinese saka calendar	613–614
Bengali calendar	98–99
Berber calendar	1642
Buddhist calendar	1236
Burmese calendar	54
Byzantine calendar	6200–6201
Chinese calendar	辛卯年 (Metal Rabbit); 3389 or 3182 — to — 壬辰年 (Water Dragon); 3390 or 3183
Coptic calendar	408–409
Discordian calendar	1858
Ethiopian calendar	684–685
Hebrew calendar	4452–4453
- Hindu calendars
Vikram Samvat	748–749
Shaka Samvat	613–614
Kali Yuga	3792–3793
Holocene calendar	10692
Iranian calendar	70–71
Islamic calendar	72–73
Japanese calendar	Shuchō 7 (朱鳥７年)
Javanese calendar	584–585
Julian calendar	692; DCXCII
Korean calendar	3025
Minguo calendar	1220 before ROC 民前1220年
Nanakshahi calendar	−776
Seleucid era	1003/1004 AG
Thai solar calendar	1234–1235
Tibetan calendar	ལྕགས་མོ་ཡོས་ལོ་ (female Iron-Hare); 818 or 437 or −335 — to — ཆུ་ཕོ་འབྲུག་ལོ་ (male Water-Dragon); 819 or 438 or −334

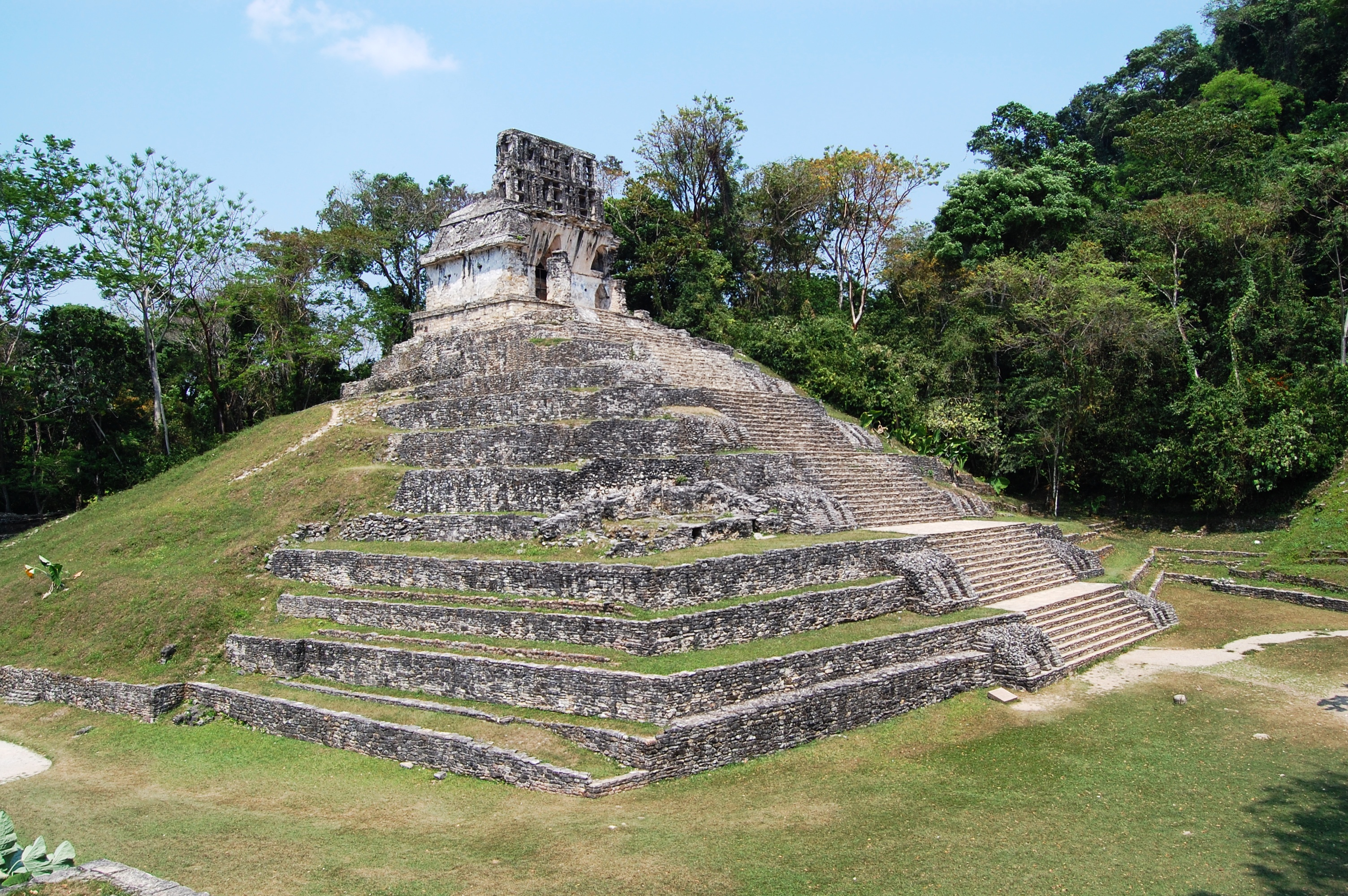
The Temple of the Cross at Palenque (Mexico)

Year 692 (DCXCII) was a leap year starting on Monday of the Julian calendar. The denomination 692 for this year has been used since the early medieval period, when the Anno Domini calendar era became the prevalent method in Europe for naming years.

== Events ==
=== By place ===
==== Byzantine Empire ====
- Battle of Sebastopolis: The Byzantine army under Leontius is defeated at Sebastopolis, (modern Turkey) by Arab forces led by Muhammad ibn Marwan. During the battle, a "special military corps" (some 20,000 Slavs) under Neboulos deserts the Byzantine lines, and goes over to the Muslim Arabs.
- Arab–Byzantine War: Muslims conquer Armenia, Iberia and Colchis, the last remaining Byzantine holdings east of the Taurus Mountains. Emperor Justinian II is forced to agree to joint Byzantine-Arab control of Cyprus, in the Eastern Mediterranean Sea (approximate date).

==== Britain ====
- King Ine of Wessex installs his kinsman, Nothelm, as ruler of Sussex. According to Bede, Sussex is subjected to Ine for a number of years.

==== Asia ====
- Empress Wu Zetian regains control of the Kingdom of Khotan in the Tarim Basin (Northwest China).

==== Mesoamerica ====
- The Temple of the Cross at Palenque (Mexico) is constructed to commemorate the rise of King Kʼinich Kan Bahlam II to the throne (approximate date).

=== By topic ===
==== Religion ====
- The Quinisext Council is held in Constantinople; it lays the foundation for the Orthodox canon law. Justinian II suppresses non-Orthodox religious practices, and orders the arrest of Pope Sergius I; the militias of Rome and the Exarchate of Ravenna refuse, and take the pope's side.

== Births ==
- Gundelina, Frankish abbess

== Deaths ==
- Abd Allah ibn al-Zubayr, Arab sahabi (b. 624)
- Asmā' bint Abi Bakr, companion of Muhammad
- Bridei III, king of the Picts
- Bʼalaj Chan Kʼawiil, a Maya ruler of Dos Pilas (b. 625)
- Two Ewalds, Saxon priests (approximate date)
- Chrothildis, Frankish queen regent
