= Li Xiaogong =

Tang Chinese imperial prince and general

Li Xiaogong 李孝恭
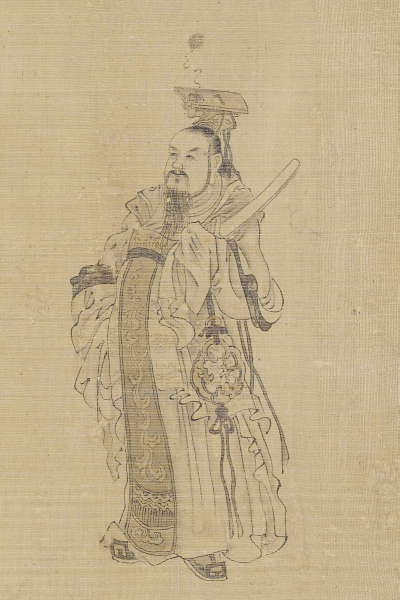
- Qing dynasty portrait of Li Xiaogong
- Born: 591
- Died: 640 (aged 48–49)
- Other names: Prince Yuan of Hejian (河間元王); Prince of Zhao Commandery (趙郡王)
- Occupations: Prince, general
- Children: Li Chongyi; Li Hui; Li Chongzhen
- Father: Li An

Li Xiaogong (591–640), posthumous name Prince Yuan of Hejian (河間元王), was an imperial prince and general of the Tang dynasty of China. He was a son of a cousin of Emperor Gaozu, the founder of the Tang dynasty, and served as a general under Emperor Gaozu. He defeated Emperor Gaozu's major competitors Xiao Xi and Fu Gongshi. He was one of the few generals of the early Tang dynasty who had already distinguished themselves in their careers before rising to prominence during the reign of Emperor Gaozu's successor, Emperor Taizong.

== Background ==
Li Xiaogong was born in 591, during the reign of Emperor Wen of Sui. His grandfather Li Wei (李蔚) was a son of the Western Wei general Li Hu (李虎), the grandfather of the major Sui general Li Yuan, and was a regional commandant during Sui's predecessor dynasty Northern Zhou. Li Xiaogong's father Li An (李安) was a general during Sui.

Li Xiaogong was considered calm and knowledgeable in his youth. After Li Yuan rebelled against Emperor Wen's son Emperor Yang of Sui in 617 and captured the capital Chang'an, declaring Emperor Yang's grandson Yang You the Prince of Dai emperor (as Emperor Gong), Li Yuan made Li Xiaogong in charge of a campaign to persuade or capture the region south of the Qinling Mountains. Li Xiaogong was able to persuade some 30 commanderies to submit to Li Yuan, and he also defeated the rebel leader Zhu Can in battle, after which he, against the advice of his subordinates, refused to slaughter the captives, and it was said that because of this, more rebels were willing to surrender to him than before.

After Emperor Yang was killed in a coup at Jiangdu (江都, in modern Yangzhou, Jiangsu) in 618, Li Yuan had Yang You yield the throne to him, establishing the Tang dynasty as its Emperor Gaozu. He made Li Xiaogong the commandant at Xin Prefecture (信州, later name changed to Kui Prefecture (夔州), modern eastern Chongqing). As Li Xiaogong's territory was contiguous with another rebel ruler, Xiao Xian the Emperor of Liang, he offered Emperor Gaozu suggestions on destroying Liang. Emperor Gaozu created him the Prince of Zhao Commandery and, in spring 621, made the general Li Jing his assistant and strategist, preparing a major assault on Liang. He commissioned the sons of many of the non-Han chieftains of the area as officers, both as a way to placate the chieftains and to hold them as collateral for their loyalty.

== Campaign against Xiao Xian ==
In fall 621, Emperor Gaozu commissioned Li Xiaogong, with Li Jing as his assistant, to launch a major attack on Xiao Xian's Liang state, with a cousin of Li Xiaogong's, Li Yuan (李瑗) the Prince of Lujiang and the other generals Tian Shikang (田世康) and Zhou Faming (周法明) attacking on other fronts. At that time, the Yangtze River had a high water level and was flowing rapidly. While many officers under him suggested delaying the campaign, Li Xiaogong, perhaps with Li Jing's suggestion, decided that indeed, the rapid water was a good opportunity to launch a surprise attack on Xiao Xian's capital Jiangling (江陵, in modern Jingzhou, Hubei). After defeating the Liang general Wen Shihong (文士弘), he put Jiangling under siege, cutting off Xiao Xian's communications with the armies in the rest of his territory. He, again possibly with Li Jing's suggestion, floated the Liang ships that he captured down the Yangtze, to confuse the approaching Liang relief forces into believing that Jiangling had fallen already. Xiao, not knowing that the relief forces were only a few days away, surrendered to Li Xiaogong. By the suggestion of Xiao's official Cen Wenben, who had persuaded Xiao to surrender, Li Xiaogong strictly prohibited pillaging and retribution against Liang generals. The Liang provinces, upon hearing the news of Jiangling's fall, soon largely submitted to Tang. Li Xiaogong delivered Xiao to Chang'an, where Emperor Gaozu executed him.

Emperor Gaozu made Li Xiaogong the commandant at Jing Prefecture (荊州, i.e., Jiangling), in charge of the former Liang territory. It was said that Li Xiaogong comforted the people, encouraging the soldiers to settle and farm, and made presses for copper coins to encourage commerce. Subsequently, his headquarters were moved to Xiang Prefecture (襄州, roughly modern Xiangfan, Hubei).

== Campaign against Fu Gongshi ==
In fall 623, the Tang general Fu Gongshi, who had served as the deputy of the powerful general Li Fuwei the Prince of Wu as the military governor of the lower Yangtze region, rebelled against Tang rule while Li Fuwei was at Chang'an, declaring himself the Emperor of Song. Emperor Gaozu commissioned Li Xiaogong to attack Fu, again making Li Jing, who was then in charge of the modern Guangdong and Guangxi region, Li Xiaogong's assistant, and also sending other generals Huang Junhan (黃君漢) and Li Shiji to attack Fu from other fronts. Before his army was set to depart Xiang Prefecture, Li Xiaogong held a feast, when, for reasons unexplained, Li Xiaogong's cup, filled with water, suddenly appeared to be filled with blood, which was considered an ill omen and causing the generals at the feast to lose heart. However, Li Xiaogong calmly stated:

Blessings and curses have no firm foundation, and it depends on how you act on them. I will not ignore the signs, and I will not make you gentlemen worry. Fu Gongshi is full of treachery and sins, and I rightfully attack him now in the name and spirit of the emperor. The blood in my cup is sign that this thief will soon lose his head!

He drank the blood-water with ease, impressing and calming his generals. He then sailed down the Yangtze, attacking and defeating the Song generals at multiple battles. Fu ordered his generals Feng Huiliang (馮慧亮) and Chen Dangshi (陳當世) to take up position at Mount Bowang (博望山, in modern Ma'anshan, Anhui), preparing for the assault, instructing Feng and Chen not to engage Li Xiaogong, but to wear him down. However, Li Xiaogong cut off their supply route, and when Feng and Chen's food supplies ran low, they challenged Li Xiaogong. Against suggestions by some officers that he bypass Feng and Chen and attack the Song capital Danyang (丹楊, in modern Nanjing, Jiangsu) directly, Li Xiaogong, perhaps with Li Jing's suggestion, confronted Feng and Chen, initially using the weaker segment of his forces to battle Feng and Chen and, after initial losses, draw Feng and Chen in deeper, and then attacked them, defeating them decisively, with the aid of Li Fuwei's subordinate general Kan Leng (闞稜). After the victory, Li Xiaogong and Li Jing attacked Danyang. Fu, in fear, abandoned Danyang and fled east to Kuaiji, but was captured by the local men in Chang prefecture (roughly modern Changzhou, Jiangsu) and delivered to Danyang.

== Later life ==
It was after Fu Gongshi was delivered to Danyang that Li Xiaogong began to undertake actions that historians found questionable. Before he executed Fu, Fu, who despised Kan for refusing to follow him, accused Kan of actually conspiring with himself. Meanwhile, Li Xiaogong was confiscating the properties of Fu's adherents, and in doing so, he also confiscated properties owned by Li Fuwei (who had died earlier that year), Wang Xiongdan (王雄誕, Fu's lieutenant who had refused to follow him in rebellion and who was executed by him), and Kan. Kan argued with Li Xiaogong on this matter, using sharp language. Li Xiaogong, in anger, accused Kan of treason and executed him. Moreover, he then, accepting Fu's propaganda that Li Fuwei had ordered him to rebel, reported the propaganda to Emperor Gaozu as the truth, and Emperor Gaozu, in turn, posthumously stripped Li Fuwei of his titles and seized Li Fuwei's wife and children as servants.

Li Xiaogong was one of the few Tang generals who achieved great independent success without being associated with Emperor Gaozu's talented son Li Shimin, and he enjoyed great reputation among the soldiers. As he was put in charge of the lower Yangtze region after defeating Fu, he rebuilt the important Southern Dynasties fortress of Shitou (near Danyang), which led to accusations that he was planning treason himself. Emperor Gaozu recalled him to the capital and had him interrogated, but after insufficient evidence was shown against him, released him and made him the minister of imperial clan affairs—a high-level position that, however, had relatively little power. He later successively served as the commandant at Liang Prefecture (涼州, roughly modern Wuwei, Gansu) and prefect of Jin Prefecture (晉州, roughly modern Linfen, Shanxi). After Li Shimin became emperor in 626 (as Emperor Taizong), his title was changed to Prince of Hejian, and he was made the minister of ceremonies.

It was said that Li Xiaogong lived luxuriously, having more than 100 dancing and singing girls at his mansion, but it was also said that he was humble and forgiving and therefore was honored by Emperor Taizong. During this period, he once made a comment to friends, suggesting that he might have intentionally lived luxuriously in order to show that he did not have ambitions:

I live in great luxury, but that is not what I actually wanted to do. I will eventually build another mansion that would be far less luxurious. After I die, if my son is capable, he can defend it more easily; if he is not, there will be less incentive for someone else to rob him of it.

In 640, Li Xiaogong died suddenly while at a feast. Emperor Taizong posthumously honored him with great honors and buried him near the tomb of Emperor Gaozu. In 643, when Emperor Taizong commissioned the Portraits at Lingyan Pavilion, to commemorate the 24 great contributors to Tang rule, Li Xiaogong's portrait was one.
