= Shen Faxing =

General, politician and king of Liang (died 620)

Liang Wang (梁王)
Family name:	Shěn (沈)
Given name:	Fǎxīng (法興)
Posthumous name:	None

Shen Faxing (died AD 620) was an official of the Chinese Sui dynasty who, after Emperor Yang was killed in a coup led by the general Yuwen Huaji in 618, seized the area of present-day Zhejiang and southern Jiangsu and declared himself the king of Liang (梁王). He was defeated by Li Zitong (Emperor of Wu) in 620 and, believing that he was doomed, committed suicide by jumping into a river.

== Background and initial uprising ==
Shen Faxing was from Hu province (湖州, roughly modern Huzhou in Zhejiang). His father Shen Ke (沈恪) was a Chen general who served all five of Chen's emperors until his death in 582 at the age of 73, with the title of Marquess of Dongxing (东兴县侯). After Shen Ke's death, Shen Faxing inherited his father's title, but Chen was destroyed by the Sui in 589.

As of 618, Shen Faxing was serving as the governor of Wuxing Commandery (吳興), the new name for Chen's Hu province, under Emperor Yang. He was on a campaign against the agrarian rebel leader Lou Shigan (樓世幹) when news came that Emperor Yang had been killed at Jiangdu (江都, modern Yangzhou, Jiangsu) in a coup led by the general Yuwen Huaji. Shen therefore, claiming that he was attacking Yuwen, gathered the troops of the region (more than 60,000 men), and occupied more than 10 commanderies, including such cities as Yuhang (餘杭, in modern Hangzhou, Zhejiang), Piling (毗陵, in modern Changzhou, Jiangsu), and Danyang (丹楊, in modern Nanjing, Jiangsu). He declared himself the grand commandant of Jiangnan (the lands south of the Yangtze River) and exercised imperial powers.

In the fall of 618, Shen sent messengers to declare his submission to the Sui emperor Yang Tong, Emperor Yang's grandson, then at the eastern capital Luoyang, but he declared for himself the exceedingly-honored titles of commander of the armed forces, grand secretary, and Duke of Tianmen, and there is no record of Yang Tong accepting his submission or granting him those offices.

== King of Liang ==
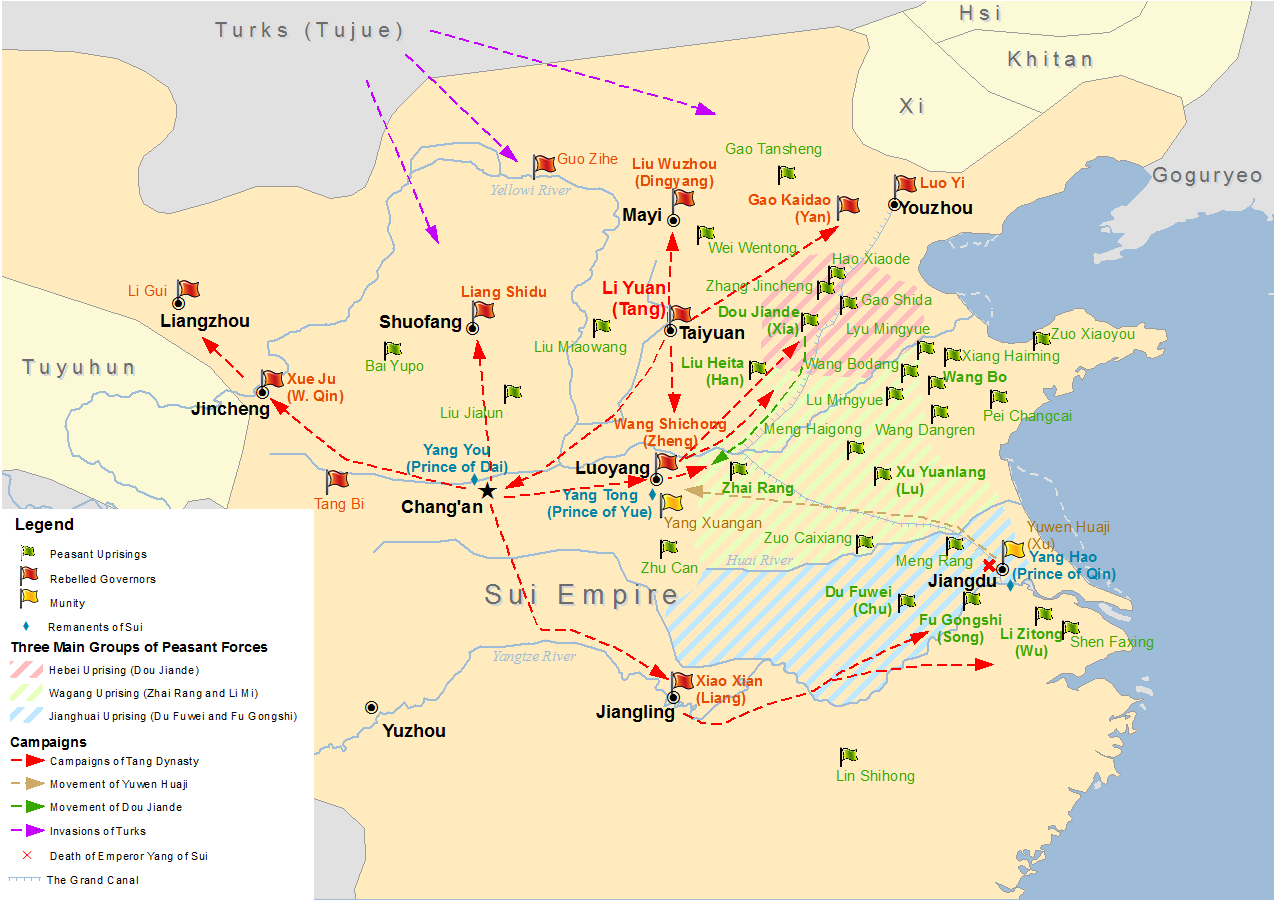
Map showing major uprisings and rebellions in the last years of Sui dynasty. Shen Faxing was a major power in the east.

By fall 619, with Sui having fallen earlier in the year after the general Wang Shichong forced Yang Tong to yield the throne and then established the new state of Zheng, Shen Faxing, believing that he could easily pacify the region south of the Huai River, declared himself the king of Liang (perhaps evoking the Liang dynasty) and set his capital at Piling. His governmental organization largely followed the Chen dynasty's model. However, it was said that Shen was cruel and only knew how to suppress dissent by massacres, and that whenever his soldiers had even small faults, they were beheaded, and therefore his subordinates despised him.

Meanwhile, rivaling Shen for the control of the region were the agrarian leader Du Fuwei at Liyang (歷陽, in modern Chaohu, Anhui); the Sui official Chen Leng (陳稜) at Jiangdu; and the agrarian leader Li Zitong at Hailing (海陵, in modern Taizhou, Jiangsu). In the fall of 619, Li was besieging Chen at Jiangling and Chen sought help from both Shen and Du. Shen sent his son Shen Guan (沈綸) with an army to assist Chen, along with Du. However, Li tricked Shen Guan and Du into attacking each other, and neither was able to assist Chen. Li was able to capture Jiangdu, and then defeated Shen Guan in battle. Both Shen Guan and Du withdrew, and Li took over the Jiangdu region.

== Defeat and death ==
In 620, Li Zitong, who had by then claimed the title of Emperor of Wu, crossed the Yangtze and captured Shen's key city Jingkou (京口, in modern Zhenjiang, Jiangsu). When Shen sent his official Jiang Yuanchao (蔣元超) against Li, Li defeated and killed Jiang. Shen abandoned Piling and fled to Wu Commandery (roughly modern Suzhou, Jiangsu). Piling and Danyang fell into Li's hands.

However, as Li was attacking Shen, Du Fuwei, who had by that point submitted to the Tang dynasty and was given the imperial surname Li (and therefore was known as Li Fuwei), sent his generals Fu Gongshi, Kan Leng (闞稜), and Wang Xiongdan (王雄誕) to attack Li Zitong, defeating him. Li Zitong's food supplies ran out, and he abandoned Jiangdu and initially fled to Jingkou, but subsequently abandoned Jingkou as well and attacked Shen. Shen, with several hundred men, abandoned Wu Commandery and fled. A local agrarian leader, Wenren Sui'an (聞人遂安), sent his general Ye Xiaobian (葉孝辯) to welcome Shen and escort him. Shen initially accepted, but on the way regretted the decision and considered assassinating Ye and fleeing toward Kuaiji (present-day Shaoxing in Zhejiang). When Ye realized this plot, Shen felt that he was trapped, and he jumped into a river to drown. Li Zitong took over the remainder of his territory, roughly modern Zhejiang.

== Era name ==
- Yánkāng (延康) 619-620

Regnal titles
Preceded by Emperor Yang of Sui	Ruler of China (Zhejiang/Southern Jiangsu); 618–620	Succeeded by Li Zitong (Emperor of Wu)
