= Dhat Irq =

Miqat and archaeological site in Mecca, Saudi Arabia

- Ḏāt ʿIrq (Arabic: ذَات عِرْق)
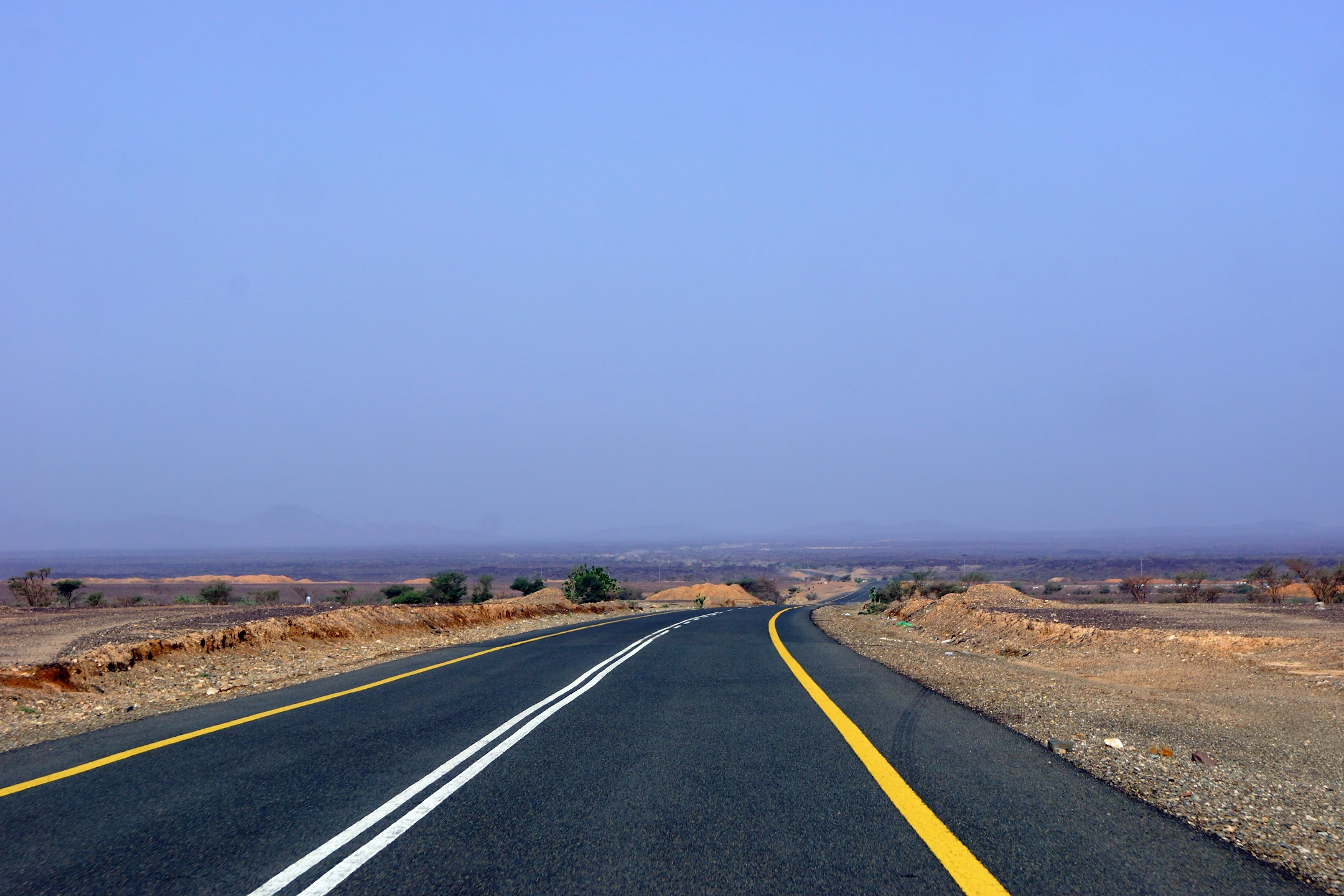
- A highway leading to Dhat Irq

- Location within Saudi Arabia Location within Middle East Location within West and Central Asia

General information
- Location: Mecca, Hejaz, Saudi Arabia
- Coordinates: 21°55′47.87″N 40°25′31.79″E

Dhat Irq (Arabic: ذَات عِرْق, romanized: Ḏāt ʿIrq) is a miqat and archaeological site in Mecca Province, Saudi Arabia.

== Etymology ==
According to the traveller Yaqut al-Hamawi, the name Dhāt 'Irq is derived from a similarly named mountain located in the Hijaz.

== Function ==
Dhat Irq is a miqat, a place where the pilgrims going on the Hajj enter the state of ihram and subsequently wear the prescribed clothing for the event. The miqat of Dhat Irq, however, is usually visited by the pilgrims who come from Iraq and Khorasan. The place is also where caravans and tour groups on the destination for pilgrimage stop to rest and meet. There is a large mosque at Dhat Irq for pilgrims to pray at, as well as additional facilities like hostels, toilets and a shopping centre. The site has also been classified as an archaeological site.

== History ==
=== Classical antiquity ===
In 599 BCE, the Neo-Babylonian ruler, Nebuchadnezzar II, invaded the Arabian Peninsula and fought against the Arab tribes in the region. The forces of Nebuchadnezzar II and Adnan, the ruler of Mecca at the time, clashed at Dhat Irq where a battle ensued. The subsequent victory was indecisive. According to the Islamic traditions, the Biblical prophet Jeremiah was involved in keeping the young Ma'ad ibn Adnan safe from harm.

=== Late Antiquitiy ===
In November 624 CE, the Sahabi and military commander Zayd ibn Harithah was sent on an expedition to Dhat Irq by the Islamic prophet Muhammad. However, the prophet himself did not participate in the expedition, as was the custom for a sariyya.

=== Early Middle Ages ===
Dhat Irq held importance to the Shi'ites after their Imam (Leader) Husayn ibn Ali had stayed there for a while to rest on his journey to the city of Kufa from his hometown. Husayn had a conversation with a local from Banu Asad about the situation in Kufa and discussed the exegesis of the seventeenth chapter of the Quran, which is Al-Isra'. The scholar Tahir al-Samawi reports that Husayn had a meeting with the sons of Abdullah ibn Ja'far and some Umayyad government officials in Dhat Irq.

=== Modern history ===
A foundation stone for a project to modernize Dhat Irq was laid in 2010 under the orders of Khalid bin Faisal Al Saud, the governor of Mecca. As of 2019, a mosque has been constructed at the site as well as pilgrim hostels and commercial centres, including shops and retail stores.

== See also ==
- Middle East
  - Islam in Saudi Arabia
