= Du Fuwei =

Du Fuwei (598? – 20 April 624), known during service to Tang dynasty as Li Fuwei (李伏威), was an agrarian leader who rose against the rule of Emperor Yang of Sui at the end of the Chinese dynasty Sui dynasty. At one point, he had ambitions to take over the region south of the Yangtze River for himself, but he later chose to submit to Tang, receiving the title of Prince of Wu. In 622, fearing that Emperor Gaozu of Tang might doubt his loyalty, he went to the Tang capital Chang'an to pay homage to Emperor Gaozu and stayed at Chang'an. In 624, his general Fu Gongshi rose against Tang rule, claiming to have his blessing, and he subsequently died at Chang'an unexpectedly; after Fu's defeat, Emperor Gaozu, believing him to be complicit with Fu's rebellion, posthumously stripped his honors and made his wife and children servants. After Emperor Gaozu's son Li Shimin became emperor in 626 (as Emperor Taizong), he knew that Du had not been complicit in Fu's plot, and therefore posthumously restored his honors and reburied him accordingly.

== Initial uprising ==
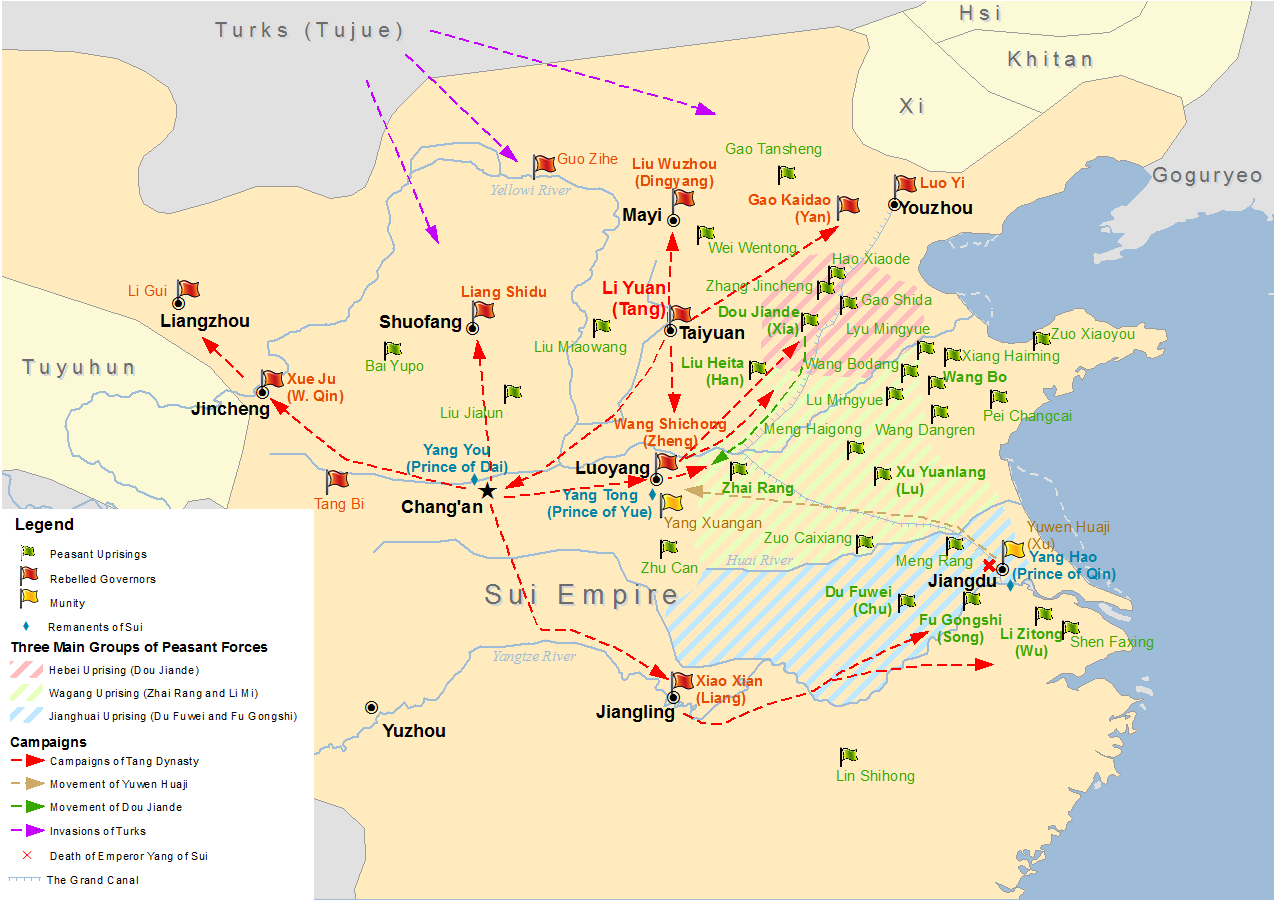
Map showing major uprisings and rebellions in the last years of Sui dynasty. The area controlled by Du Fuwei and Fu Gongshi was shaded in blue.

Du Fuwei was from Qi Province (齊州, roughly modern Jinan, Shandong). He was said to be a free-spirit in his youth and uninterested in making a living, and his best friend Fu Gongshi often stole sheep from Fu's uncle to give to Du, causing both of them to come to the attention of the police. They fled, and they became agrarian rebels against Sui dynasty rule. At that time—in or shortly before 613—Du was 15. On account of his bravery—it was said that whenever the rebels were engaging in battles, Du always went first, and whenever they withdrew, he was always last. There was another rebel leader in the region, Miao Haichao (苗海潮), and Du sent Fu to tell Miao:

We all rose because we could not endure Sui's cruel rule, and we rose in righteousness. Because our strengths are divided, I often fear that we will be captured. If we combine our troops, we will be strong enough to resist Sui forces. If you believe yourself to be strong enough to be the leader, I will submit. If you believe that you cannot, accept my command. Otherwise, we shall settle this issue in a battle.

In fear, Miao submitted to him. Du combined their forces and headed south across the Huai River, declaring himself general. The Sui general Song Hao (宋顥) attacked him. Du pretended to be defeated and trapped Sui forces in a marsh, and then set fire to the marsh plants, killing much of the Sui troops by fire. He soon also killed another rebel leader, Zhao Pozhen (趙破陣), and took over Zhao's troops. Another rebel leader, Li Zitong, joined him in 615, but soon tried to assassinate him. He was seriously wounded, but he was saved by his subordinate Wang Xiongdan (王雄誕). Subsequently, he was also attacked and defeated by the Sui general Lai Zheng (來整), and he barely escaped due to the efforts of Wang and one Lady Wang, the wife of his subordinate Ximen Junyi (西門君儀). Du's forces collapsed, but he was soon able to regroup.

Around this time as well, Du selected 30-odd particularly fierce warriors among his soldiers, and he adopted them as sons, even though he himself was only 17 years old at this point and therefore could not have been much, if at all, older than they were—the first recorded instance in Chinese history of such actions to create familial relations among military men. The most able among these adopted sons were Wang Xiongdan and Kan Leng (闞稜). As Du and Fu were best friends who referred to each other as brother, the army, in addition to referring to Du as "father," also referred to Fu as "uncle."

== Struggle for control of lower Yangtze region ==
Map of the situation in northern China during the transition from the Sui to the Tang, with the main contenders for the throne and the main military operations

By fall 616, Du had settled in at Liuhe (六合, in modern Nanjing, Jiangsu). Fellow rebel leaders Li Zitong and Zuo Xiangcai (左相才) were also nearby, and Emperor Yang of Sui, then at Jiangdu (江都, in modern Yangzhou, Jiangsu), sent his general Chen Leng (陳稜) against them. Initially, Chen enjoyed some successes against them, but in spring 617, Du intentionally enraged Chen by sending Chen women clothes and referring to him as "Grandmother Chen"—a tactic (unsuccessfully) employed by Zhuge Liang during the Three Kingdoms era against Sima Yi—causing Chen to attack him prematurely with insufficient preparation, and he defeated Chen, who barely escaped with his life. Du then captured Gaoyou (高郵, in modern Yangzhou) and then Liyang (歷陽, in modern Chaohu, Anhui), making Liyang his headquarters and declaring himself the commandant of Liyang. He thereafter gathered more troops among the local rebels.

Around this time, Du selected 5,000 elite soldiers and called them the Shangmu (上募, i.e., "the best conscriptees"), giving them special privileges. Whenever there were battles, the Shangmu would battle first, and after the battle, he would examine their backs; if anyone had wounds on his back, Du would execute him, believing him to have retreated. Du himself did not gather wealth, but gave the plunder to the soldiers. If a soldier died in battle, Du would force the soldier's wife and concubines to die as well and then bury them together. It was said that these actions inspired his soldiers to fight hard and appreciate him.

In spring 618, Emperor Yang was killed in a coup led by his general Yuwen Huaji. Yuwen declared Emperor Yang's nephew Yang Hao emperor and soon abandoned Jiangdu, heading north back toward the eastern capital Luoyang, where Emperor Yang's grandson Yang Tong was declared emperor by a group of Sui officials. Before Yuwen departed Jiangdu, he sent messengers to Du, commissioning Du as the governor of Liyang Commandery. Du refused the commission, instead offering submission to Yang Tong. Yang Tong commissioned Du as the grand commandant of the eastern forces and created him the Prince of Chu.

Meanwhile, Du was contending for the control of the region with Chen Leng, who took over Jiangdu after Yuwen's departure; Li Zitong, then at Hailing (海陵, in modern Taizhou, Jiangsu); and Shen Faxing, then at Piling (毗陵, in modern Changzhou, Jiangsu) and who claimed the title of Prince of Liang. In fall 619, Li was sieging Chen at Jiangling, and Chen sought help from both Shen and Du. Shen sent his son Shen Guan (沈綸) with an army to assist Chen, along with Du. However, Li tricked Shen Guan and Du into attacking each other, and neither was able to assist Chen. Li was able to capture Jiangdu, and then defeated Shen Guan in battle. Both Shen Guan and Du withdrew, and Li took over the Jiangdu region. Li declared himself the Emperor of Wu. With Yang Tong's regime having fallen earlier that year when Yang Tong's official Wang Shichong forced Yang Tong to yield the throne to him, ending Sui and establishing a new state of Zheng, Du decided to submit to the Tang dynasty. Emperor Gaozu of Tang commissioned Du as the commandant of He Prefecture (i.e., Liyang) and the commander of the forces south of the Huai River. He also continued to have Du hold the title of Prince of Chu.

== Submission to the Tang dynasty ==
In summer 620, Emperor Gaozu changed Du Fuwei's title to Prince of Wu, and bestowed on him the imperial surname of Li. Du was thereafter known as Li Fuwei. Fu Gongshi was created the Duke of Shu.

Later that year, Li Zitong attacked Shen Faxing, taking over several major cities from Shen, including Jingkou (京口, in modern Zhenjiang, Jiangsu), Danyang (丹楊, in modern Nanjing), and Shen's capital Piling, forcing Shen to flee. Li Fuwei, in turn, sent Fu to attack Li Zitong, with Kan Leng and Wang Xiongdan as Fu's assistants. They defeated Li Zitong, whose food supplies soon ran out. Li Zitong abandoned Jiangdu and fled to Jingkou, and then further east, attacking Shen and forcing Shen to commit suicide. Li Zitong took over modern Zhejiang from Shen, while modern central and southern Jiangsu came under Li Fuwei's control, and Li Fuwei moved his headquarters from Liyang to Danyang.

In spring 621, with Emperor Gaozu's son Li Shimin the Prince of Qin putting the Zheng capital Luoyang under siege, Du sent his generals Chen Zhengtong (陳正通) and Xu Shaozong (徐紹宗), with 2,000 men, to assist Li Shimin in his campaign. Chen and Xu were able to capture the Zheng city Liangcheng (梁城, in modern Ruzhou, Henan).

In winter 621, Li Fuwei sent Wang Xiongdan against Li Zitong. Wang, after first tricking Li Zitong into a panic back to Hangzhou (杭州, in modern Hangzhou, Zhejiang), forced Li Zitong to surrender. Li Fuwei sent Li Zitong and Li Zitong's key official Le Botong (樂伯通) to the Tang capital Chang'an, but Emperor Gaozu spared them. Wang Xiongdan subsequently also persuaded two other major rebel leaders, Wang Hua (汪華) and Wenren Sui'an (聞人遂安), to surrender. It was said that, by this point, Li Fuwei controlled all of the territory south of the Huai River, as far south as the Xianxia Mountain (仙霞嶺, i.e., roughly the border of modern Zhejiang and Fujian).

== Death ==
By this point, although Li Fuwei still outwardly treated Fu Gongshi as a brother, he was actually suspicious of Fu, and so he made Wang Xiongdan and Kan Leng be in actual command of his forces. Fu resented the treatment but, in response, pretended to no longer care about earthly matters, practicing alchemy with his friend Zuo Youxian (左遊仙). It was said that Li Fuwei himself was acquainted with alchemy and, as part of the exercise to try to live long, consumed mica frequently notwithstanding the poisons contained therein.

In fall 622, Li Shimin was attacking and prevailing over Xu Yuanlang the Prince of Lu, and his army was near Li Fuwei's domain. Li Fuwei, fearing that his loyalty might be doubted, requested to go to Chang'an to pay homage to Emperor Gaozu, taking Kan with him. Before he departed, he left Fu in command, with Wang as Fu's deputy, in actual command of the forces, secretly warning Wang, "If I suffer no ill consequences, make sure that Fu does nothing rash." When Li Fuwei got to Chang'an, Emperor Gaozu gave him the special treatment of allowing him to sit with Emperor Gaozu on the imperial seat and, at other occasions, honor even above Emperor Gaozu's son Li Yuanji the Prince of Qi. However, he did not permit Li Fuwei or Kan to return to Danyang, making Kan a general. In spring 623, he further bestowed the honorific office of Taibao (太保, one of the Three Excellencies) on Li Fuwei.

Meanwhile, in fall 623, Fu, after tricking Wang into surrendering his command and killing him, rebelled, claiming that Li Fuwei had been detained and had secretly ordered him to rise against Tang. Fu soon declared himself the Emperor of Song. In April 624, Li Fuwei died suddenly—with official sources suggesting that he was poisoned by the substances he was taking as a part of alchemical exercises, but also, in a veiled manner, leaving open the possibility that he was assassinated on Emperor Gaozu's orders. After Li Xiaogong the Prince of Zhao Commandery, a son of a cousin of Emperor Gaozu, defeated and killed Fu later that year, Li Xiaogong believed Fu's declaration that he was rebelling under Li Fuwei's orders, and therefore reported it to Emperor Gaozu. Emperor Gaozu ordered that Li Fuwei's titles be posthumously stripped, and that his wife and children be arrested and made slaves. After Li Shimin became emperor (as Emperor Taizong) in 626, he knew that Li Fuwei was not part of Fu's plot, and therefore restored Li Fuwei's titles, released his wife and children, and reburied him with honor, albeit not with the honor due to a prince, but only of a duke.

== Notes and references ==
- Old Book of Tang, vol. 56.
- New Book of Tang, vol. 92.
- Zizhi Tongjian, vols. 182, 183, 186, 187, 188, 189, 190.
