= Fu Gongshi =

Chinese agrarian rebel leader (died 624)

- Reign: 623–624
- Died: 624
Full name
- Family name: Fǔ (輔); Given name: Gōngshí (公祏)
- Dynasty: Sòng (宋)

Fu Gongshi (輔公祏; died 624) was an agrarian rebel leader who served as Du Fuwei's lieutenant during the disintegration of the Chinese Sui dynasty, who later followed Du in submitting to the Tang dynasty. In 623, while Du (by that point known as Li Fuwei after being bestowed the imperial surname) was at the Tang capital Chang'an, Fu rose against Tang rule at Danyang (丹楊, in modern Nanjing, Jiangsu) and declared himself emperor of a new state of Song. In 624, he was defeated by the Tang general Li Xiaogong. He fled, but was captured and delivered to Li Xiaogong, who executed him.

== Initial uprising ==
Fu Gongshi was from Qi Province (齊州, roughly modern Jinan, Shandong). He often stole sheep from his uncle to give to his best friend Du Fuwei, who was younger than he was, causing both of them to come to the attention of the police. They fled, and they became agrarian rebels against Sui dynasty rule, in or briefly before 613. Du eventually became a major rebel leader, and Fu served as his lieutenant. In 613, it was Fu who, at Du's direction, persuaded another rebel leader, Miao Haichao (苗海潮), to submit to Du's leadership, and he also contributed to Du's subsequent surprise attack and killing of another rebel leader, Zhao Pochen (趙破陳).

== Submission to Tang ==
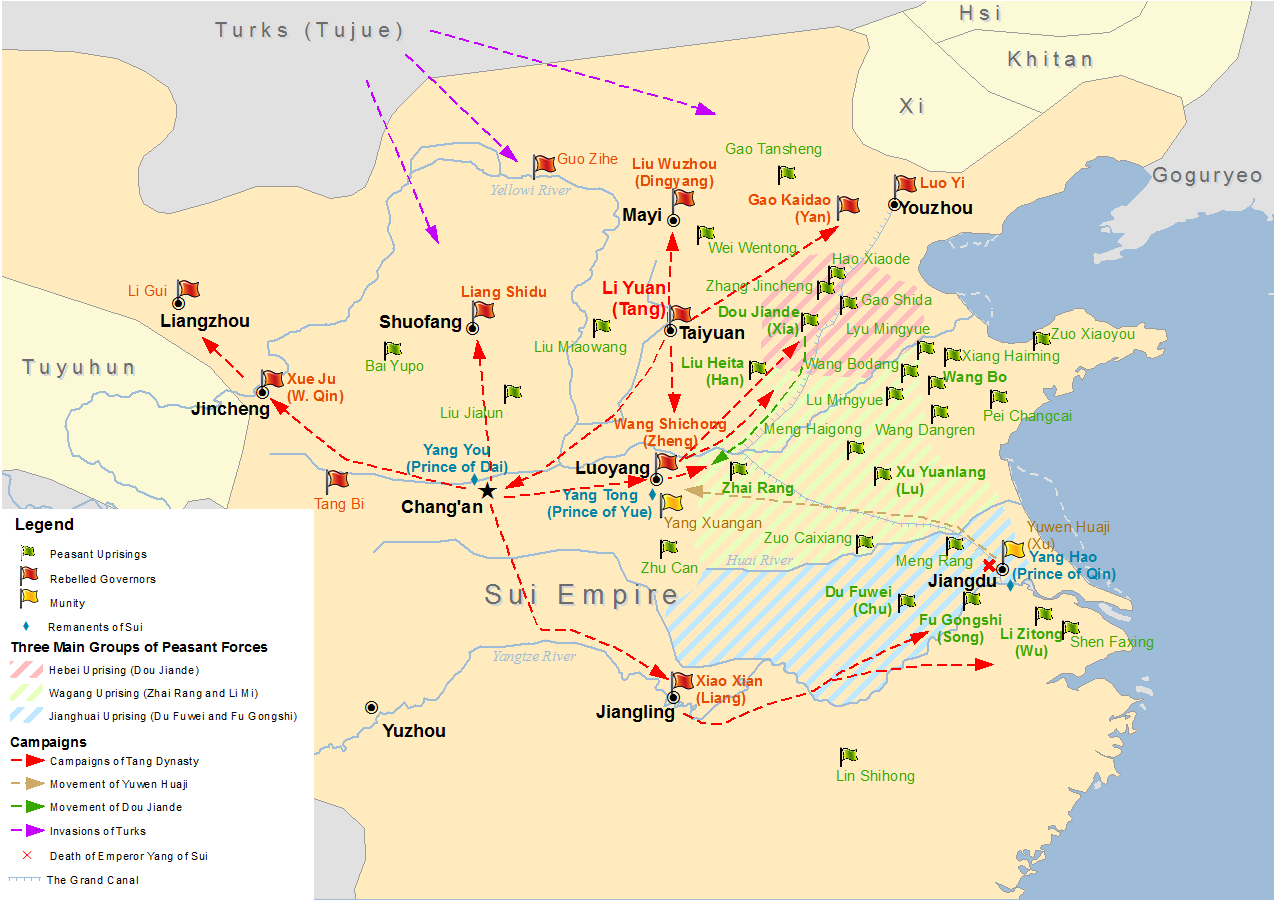
Map showing major uprisings and rebellions in the last years of the Sui dynasty. The greatest extent of land controlled by Du Fuwei and Fu Gongshi before submission to Tang was shaded in blue.

After the death of Emperor Yang of Sui in 618, Du Fuwei initially contended for supremacy of the lower Yangtze River region with fellow rebel leader Li Zitong the Emperor of Wu and the former Sui officials Shen Faxing the Prince of Liang and Chen Leng (陳稜), but after he was defeated by Li in 619, he submitted to the Tang dynasty. Emperor Gaozu of Tang (Li Yuan) commissioned Du as the commandant of the region, and in summer 620, Emperor Gaozu created Du the Prince of Wu, bestowed on him the imperial house surname of Li, and made him the head of the branch imperial government for the region, while creating Fu Gongshi the Duke of Shu and making him Du's deputy.

Later that year, Li Fuwei commissioned Fu to lead an army against Li Zitong, with Li Fuwei's officers (whom he had formally adopted as sons) Wang Xiongdan (王雄誕) and Kan Leng (闞稜) as Fu's assistants. Fu was quickly able to capture Danyang, and he had initial further battle successes against Li Zitong. However, after a Li Zitong counterattack, Fu stopped engaging Li Zitong. Wang, against Fu's orders, counterattacked himself and defeated Li Zitong, forcing him to flee and take over Shen's territory, while Li Zitong's former territory came under Li Fuwei's control.

== Rebellion against Tang ==
Meanwhile, friction had been developing between Li Fuwei and Fu Gongshi. It had been that for years, the army, knowing the great friendship between Li Fuwei and Fu, honored Li Fuwei as its father and Fu as its "uncle." Eventually, however, Li Fuwei became suspicious of the respect the army had for Fu, and began to give more authorities to Wang Xiongdan and Kan Leng, giving them effective command of the army. When Fu realized that Li Fuwei was suspecting him, he became resentful, but pretended to lose interest in the army, instead studying alchemy with his friend Zuo Youxian (左遊仙).

In 622, Li Fuwei, fearful that Emperor Gaozu might doubt his loyalty, went to the Tang capital Chang'an to pay homage to Emperor Gaozu, taking Kan with him. Before he departed, he left Fu in command, with Wang as Fu's deputy, in actual command of the forces, secretly warning Wang, "If I suffer no ill consequences, make sure that Fu does nothing rash." When Li Fuwei got to Chang'an, Emperor Gaozu gave him the special treatment of allowing him to sit with Emperor Gaozu on the imperial seat and, at other occasions, honor even above Emperor Gaozu's son Li Yuanji the Prince of Qi. However, he did not permit Li Fuwei or Kan to return to Danyang, making Kan a general.

Once Li Fuwei left Danyang, Zuo persuaded Fu into planning a rebellion. However, Wang had actual command of the army, and therefore, Fu decided to trick Wang by claiming that Li Fuwei was doubting Wang's loyalty. Wang, angry over the revelation, gave up command of the army, and Fu took control and then tried to persuade Wang to join his plot. Wang, realizing that he had been tricked, nevertheless refused to join Fu, so Fu strangled him. In fall 623, Fu, claiming that Li Fuwei had been detained by Emperor Gaozu and had ordered him to rebel, did so. He soon declared himself the Emperor of Song, and he was able to get another rebel leader who had submitted to Tang as well, Zhang Shan'an (張善安), who controlled the modern northern Jiangxi and eastern Hubei region, to submit to him. Emperor Gaozu sent his generals Li Xiaogong the Prince of Zhao Commandery (the son of his cousin), Li Jing, Huang Junhan (黃君漢), and Li Shiji against Fu, with Li Xiaogong in overall command. In winter 623, Zhang was captured by the Tang general Li Daliang, cutting off a flank support for Fu.

== Defeat and death ==
For several months, Tang and Song forces battled on the border, but as the main forces under Li Xiaogong and Li Jing approached, Fu had his generals Feng Huiliang (馮慧亮) and Chen Dangshi (陳當世) take up defense positions at Mount Bowang (博望山, in modern Ma'anshan, Anhui), preparing for the assault. Fu's orders to Feng and Chen were to refuse engagement and to wear the Tang forces out, but Li Xiaogong cut off their food supplies, and so they abandoned the strategy and challenged Li Xiaogong. Most of Li Xiaogong's subordinates believed that Feng and Chen had a strong army and could not be easily defeated, and so that Li Xiaogong should bypass them and attack Danyang directly. However, Li Jing opposed, pointing out that if Tang forces did not defeat Feng and Chen first, they would not be able to siege the well-fortified Danyang easily. Li Xiaogong agreed and engaged Feng and Chen directly, defeating them, as the Song forces lost morale when they saw that Kan was fighting on the Tang side. Feng and Chen fled back to Danyang.

Li Xiaogong and Li Jing trailed them and approached Danyang. Fu, in fear, abandoned Danyang and fled east, heading toward Kuaiji (modern Shaoxing), a fortified city on Hangzhou Bay then defended by Zuo. On the way, however, his army began to desert, and he only had 500 men left when he reached Chang Prefecture (常州, roughly modern Changzhou, Jiangsu). There, his subordinate Wu Sao (吳騷) considered seizing him and surrendering. When Fu discovered this, he fled with less than 100 guards; when he reached Wukang (武康, in modern Huzhou, Zhejiang), he was attacked by the men of the country. After his confidant, Ximen Junyi (西門君儀), was killed in the battle, he was captured. He was delivered to Danyang, where Li Xiaogong executed him. Before he died, he falsely implicated Kan in his plot as well, and Li Xiaogong, already in conflict with Kan over Kan's opposition to his confiscation of property, executed Kan as well.

Regnal titles
Preceded by Emperor Gaozu of Tang	Emperor of China (Zhejiang/Southern Jiangsu); 623–624	Succeeded by Emperor Gaozu of Tang
