= Empress Dowager Liu =

Empress Dowager Liu may refer to:

- Empress Liu (Shi Le's wife) (died 333), empress dowager of the Later Zhao dynasty during Shi Hong's reign
- Empress Liu (Shi Hu's wife) (318–349), empress dowager of the Later Zhao dynasty during Shi Shi's reign
- Empress Liu (Chen dynasty) (534–616), empress dowager of the Chen dynasty
- Empress Dowager Liu (Sui dynasty) (fl. 605–618), empress dowager of the Sui dynasty
- Empress Dowager Liu (Later Jin) (died 942), empress dowager and grand empress dowager of the Later Jin dynasty
- Empress Liu (Zhenzong) (969–1033), empress dowager during Emperor Renzong of Song's reign
- Empress Liu (Zhezong) (1079–1113), empress dowager during Emperor Huizong of Song's reign

== See also ==
- Empress Liu (disambiguation)
