= Emperor Gong of Sui =

Emperor Gong of Sui may refer to two rulers at the end of the Sui dynasty:

- Yang You (605–619, reigned 617–618), puppet emperor installed by the rebel Li Yuan (future Emperor Gaozu of Tang)
- Yang Tong (604–619, reigned 618–619), puppet emperor dominated by the rebel Wang Shichong
