= Empress Liu =

Empress Liu may refer to:

- Liu E (Han-Zhao) (died 314), third empress consort of Liu Cong, emperor of Han-Zhao
- Empress Liu (fl. 315), a later empress consort of Liu Cong, see Liu Cong's later empresses
- Empress Liu (Liu Yao's second empress) (died 326), Liu Yao's second empress during the Former Zhao dynasty
- Empress Liu (Liu Yao's third empress) (fl. 326), personal name Liu Fang, Liu Yao's third empress and a cousin of Liu Yao's second empress
- Empress Liu (Shi Le's wife) (died 333), Shi Le's consort during the Later Zhao dynasty
- Empress Liu (Shi Hu's wife) (318–349), Shi Hu's consort during the Later Zhao dynasty
- Empress Liu (Huan Xuan's wife) (fl. 404), wife of Huan Xuan (ruler of Chu)
- Empress Liu (Chen dynasty) (534–616), personal name Liu Jingyan, empress of the Chen dynasty
- Empress Dowager Liu (Sui dynasty) (fl. 605–618), empress dowager of the Sui dynasty
- Empress Liu (Tang dynasty) (died 693), empress of the Tang dynasty
- Empress Liu (Li Maozhen's wife) (877–943), wife of Li Maozhen (ruler of Qi)
- Empress Liu (Li Cunxu's wife) (died 926), Li Cunxu's consort during the Later Tang dynasty
- Empress Liu (Li Congke's wife) (died 937), Li Congke's consort during the Later Tang dynasty
- Empress Dowager Liu (Later Jin) (died 942), empress dowager of the Later Jin dynasty
- Empress Liu (Zhenzong) (969–1033), Emperor Zhenzong of Song's consort and empress dowager during Emperor Renzong of Song's reign
- Empress Liu (Zhezong) (1079–1113), Emperor Zhezong of Song's consort and empress dowager during Emperor Huizong of Song's reign
