= Tomb of An Bei =

Ancient tomb in China

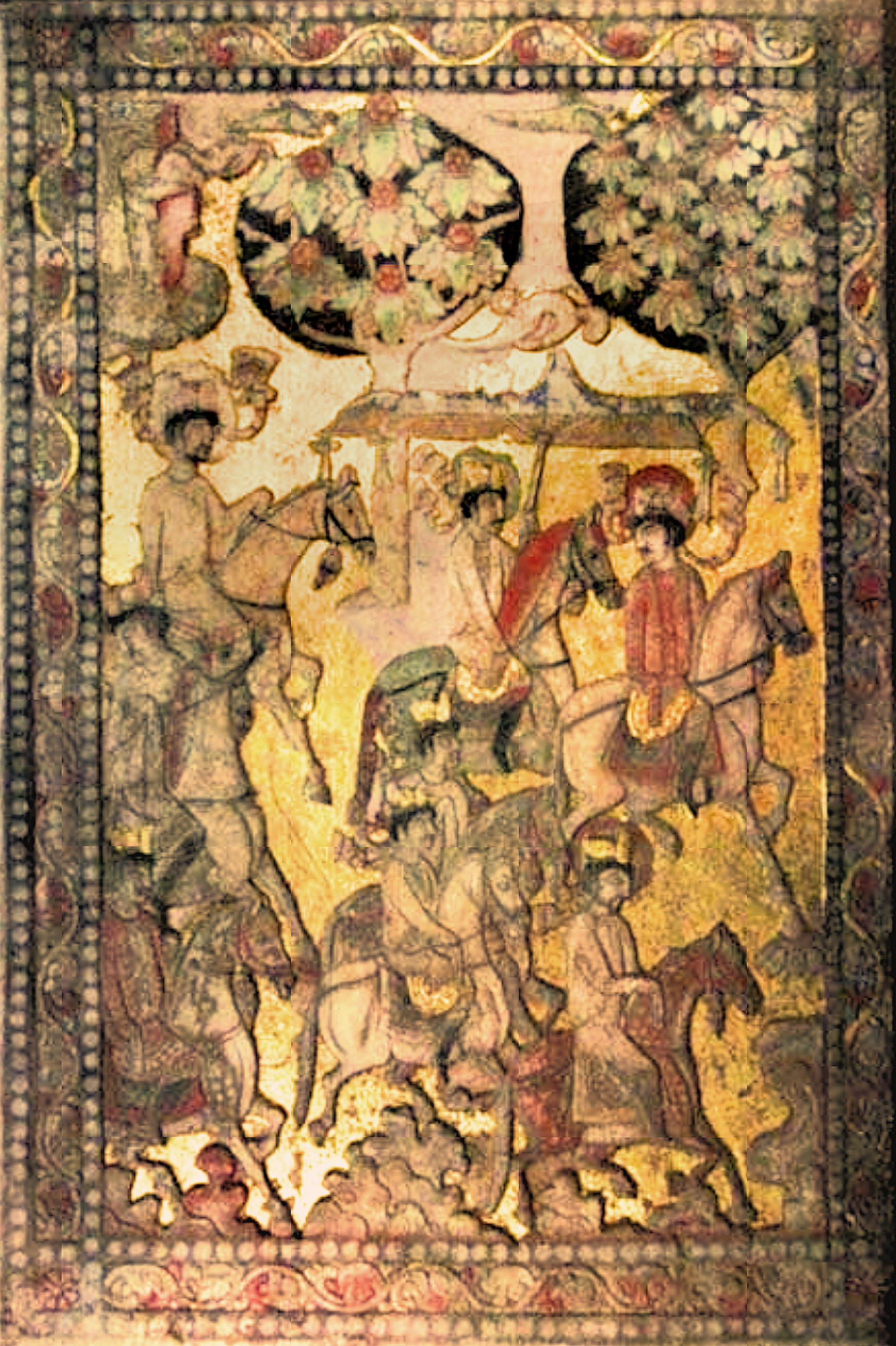
- One of the decorated panels of the tomb of An Bei, showing a procession of non-Chinese foreigners led by An Bei.
- Created: 589 CE

Location

The Tomb of Ān Bèi (Chinese: 安備墓), is a 589 CE (Sui dynasty) funeral monument of a Sogdian man named "An Bei" in his Chinese epitaph. The tomb was looted in 2006-2007, and its content sold in the art market. Part of the base of the tomb as well as the epitaph are now in the Tang West Market Museum (大唐西市博物館) in Xi'an.

== Life ==
An Bei was probably a third generation Sogdian immigrant to China. His family originated from the city of Bukhara, as suggested by the name "An". An's family came to China during the Northern Wei dynasty, and some of his relatives served in the Bureau of Tributaries. Anbei's father was named An Zhishi, and he served as a middle-ranking officer in the honour guards of the court.

According to the epitaph, An Bei lived in Luoyang. He became a low-level clerk in the military headquarters of a vassal of the emperor, during the Northern Qi period. When the Northern Qi were replaced by the Northern Zhou in 577 CE, An Bei returned to Luoyang where he died at the young age of 34, in 589 CE. An Bei followed the Confucian moral principles of filial piety, and practiced Zoroastrianism.

== Tomb ==
The tomb was composed of a stone couch with decorative panels, a structure which is typical of tombs built in China at that time. The panels show a procession and a caravan of non-Chinese people, a banquet scene with Sogdian music and dance, and a drinking scene in a garden. One panel show the deceased leading a caravan, another the deceased leading a procession of nimbate men, a possible scene of the afterlife. Many wear pseudo-Sasanian crowns. Another panel shows a banquet scene, with danse and music. The last panel scene seems to belong to the afterlife, showing Bacchantic individuals, similar to the Indian Kubera, drinking wine.

Other known tombs of Sogdians in China generally belong to high-ranked officials who were heads of a Prefecture, or "Sàbǎo" (薩保, "Protector, Guardian", derived from the Sogdian word s'rtp'w, "caravan leader"), used for government-appointed leaders of the Sogdian immigrant-merchant community. On the contrary, An Bei was far from being an aristocrat, and was a quite ordinary person. He was also quite integrated to Chinese society, as, according to the epitaph, "Although he is a foreigner, after a long life in China, there is no difference between him and the Chinese".

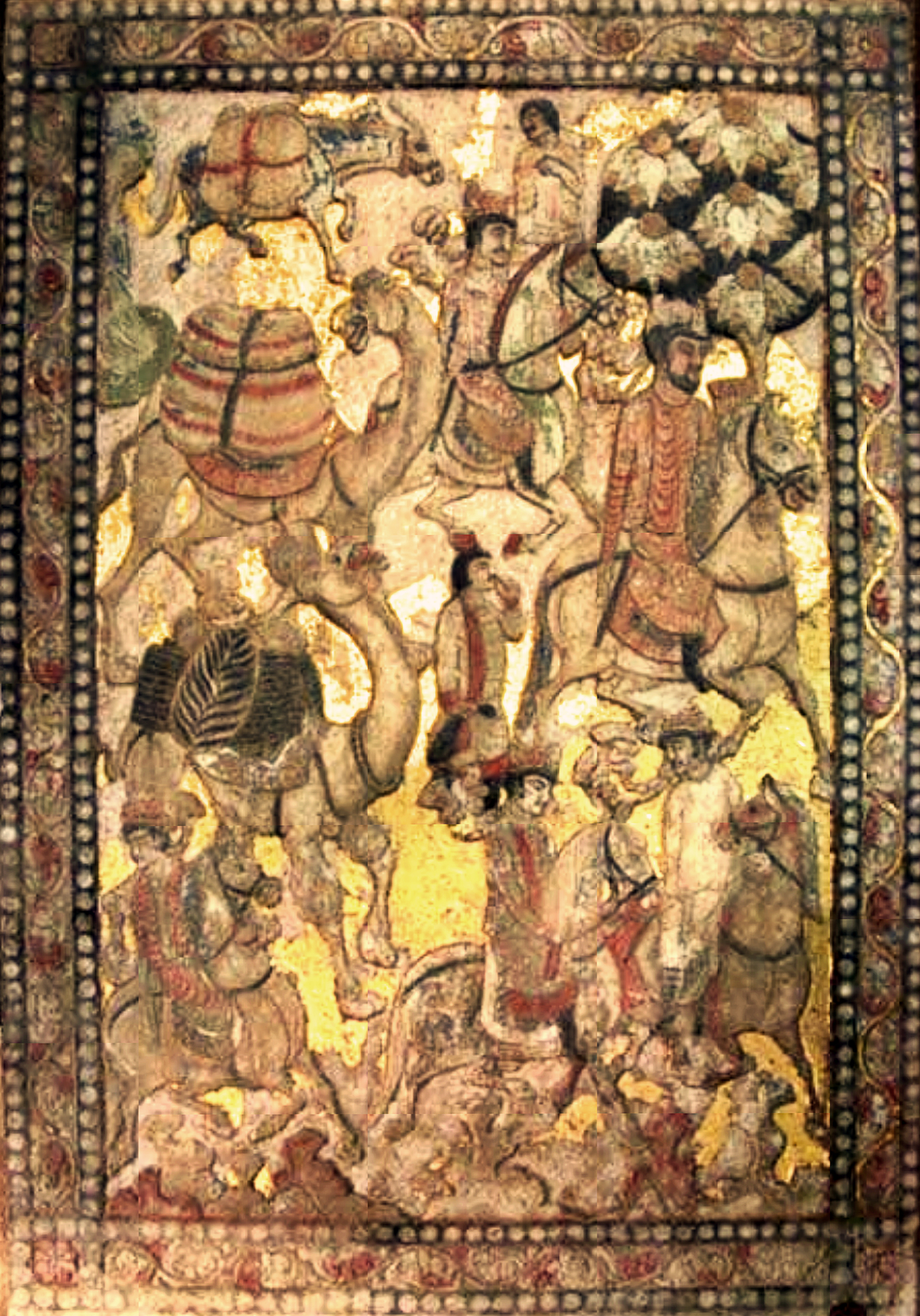
Tomb panel showing a Central Asian caravan led by An Bei.

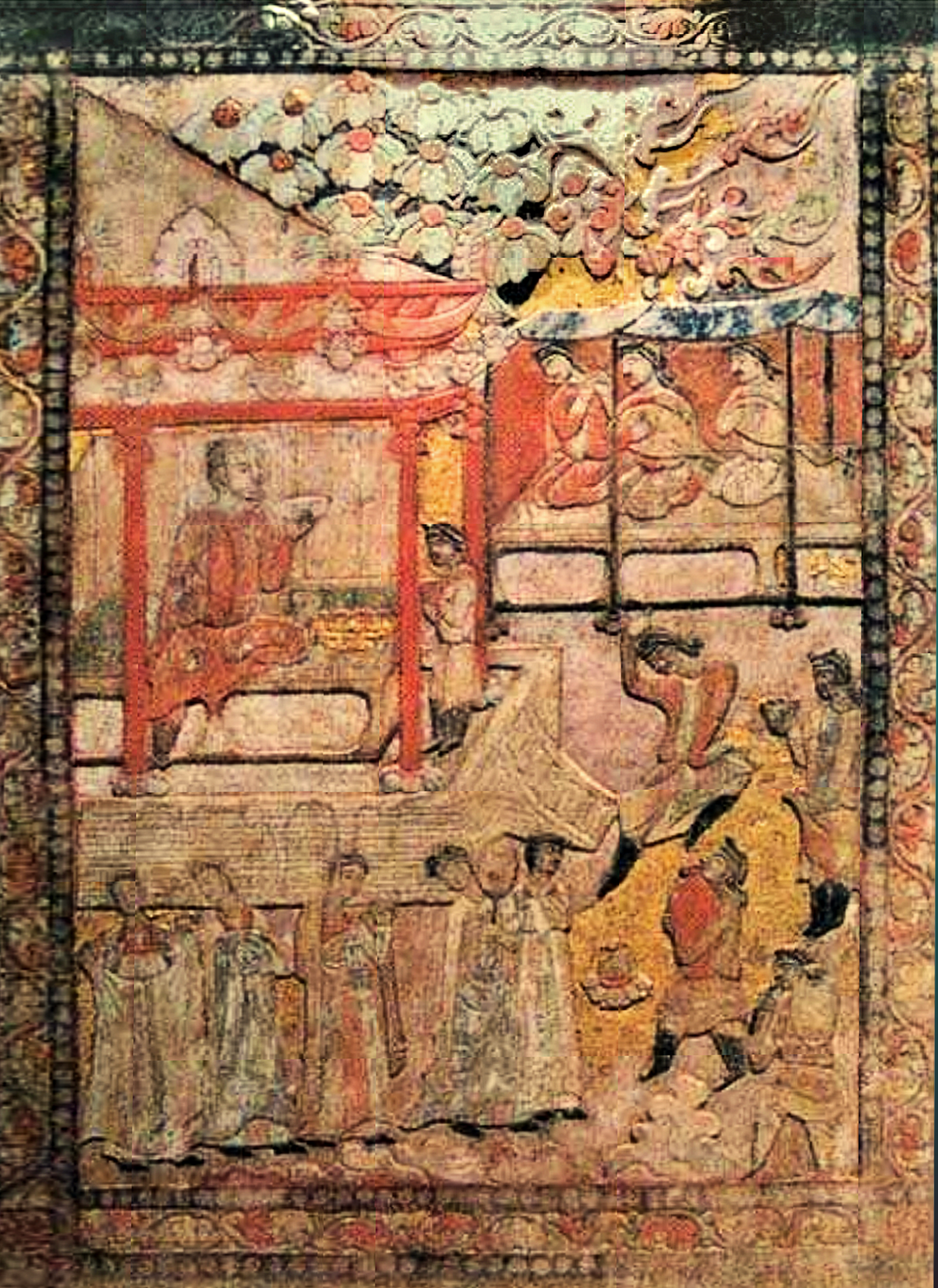
Tomb panel showing a banquet with Sogdian dance and music.

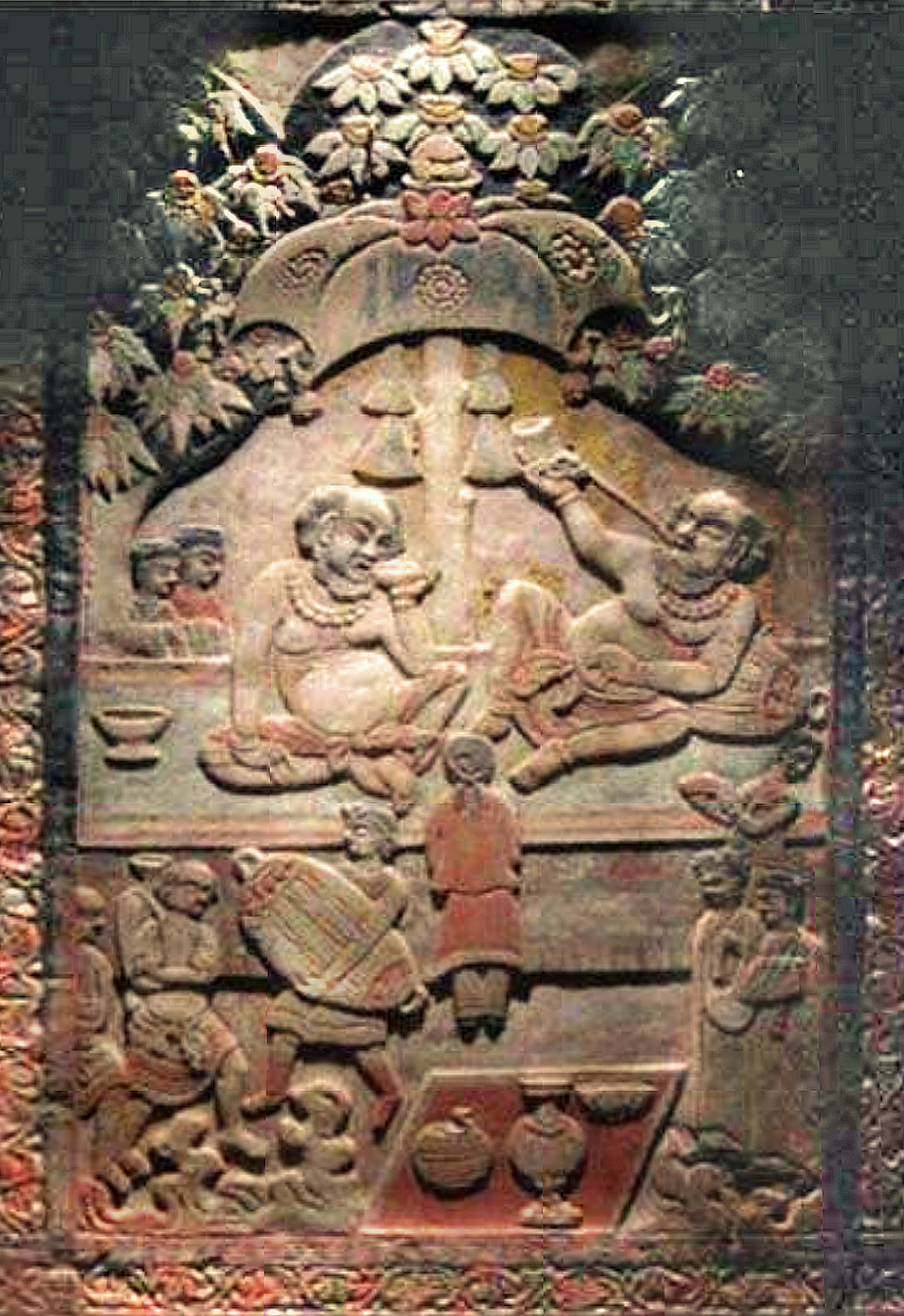
Tomb panel showing a drinking party in a garden.
