= Yang Zhao =

Chinese crown prince (584–606)

- Born: 584
- Died: 606 (aged 21–22)
- Spouse: Consort Cui; Consort Wei; Older Lady Liu; Younger Lady Liu
- Issue: Yang Yan; Yang Tong; Yang You
- Father: Emperor Yang of Sui
- Mother: Empress Xiao

Yang Zhao (楊昭) (21 February 584 – 30 August 606), formally Crown Prince Yuande (元德太子, literally "the discerning and nurturing crown prince"), posthumously honored as Emperor Xiaocheng (孝成皇帝, literally "the filial and successful emperor") with the temple name Shizong (世宗) during the brief reign of his son Yang Tong, was a crown prince of the Chinese Sui dynasty. He was the oldest son of Emperor Yang (Yang Guang) who predeceased his father. Yang Zhao was described as a fat-looking man with great physical strength.

== Background ==
Yang Zhao was born in February 584, while his father Yang Guang was the Prince of Jin under his grandfather Emperor Wen. His mother was Yang Guang's wife Princess Xiao, and he was their oldest son. In his infancy, he was raised by his grandparents Emperor Wen and Empress Dugu. In 590, Emperor Wen created him the Prince of Henan. He initially married the daughter of the official Cui Hongsheng (崔弘昇) as his wife and princess, but after Princess Cui's aunt, who married his uncle Yang Jun the Prince of Qin, was discovered to have poisoned Yang Jun over her jealousness for Yang Jun's concubines in 597, Yang Zhao divorced his wife and married the daughter of the official Wei Shou (韋壽) the Duke of Hua as his wife and princess. After his father Yang Guang displaced his uncle Yang Yong as crown prince in 600, Yang Zhao was created his father's old title of Prince of Jin in 601.

== As crown prince ==
In 604, Emperor Wen died—a death that most traditional historians believed to be a murder ordered by Yang Guang, but admitted a lack of direct evidence—and Yang Guang took the throne as Emperor Yang. Soon, believing the words of the sorcerer Zhangchou Taiyi (章仇太翼) that the geography of the region or feng shui surrounding the capital Chang'an was unsuitable for him, Emperor Yang took up residence at Luoyang and made it the eastern capital. He left Yang Zhao in charge at Chang'an. In spring 605, Emperor Yang created Yang Zhao crown prince. Emperor Yang considered restoring Princess Cui, but when he sent a messenger to the house of Princess Cui's uncle Cui Hongdu (崔弘度) to discuss the matter, Cui Hongdu did not realize that an imperial messenger had arrived and therefore did not respond. Emperor Yang was displeased, and the matter was not again discussed.

In 606, Yang Zhao went to Luoyang to greet his parents, and he spent several months there. He requested permission to remain longer at Luoyang, but Emperor Yang denied it. Meanwhile, because he was required to kneel before his father and had to do so repeatedly while at Luoyang, and he was severely overweight, he became ill from the fatigue, and he died in summer 606. When his son Yang Tong later took the throne in 618 during the dynasty's disintegration, he was posthumously honored as an emperor.

== Family ==
Consorts and their respective issue(s):

- Princess Consort of Henan, of the Cui clan of Boling (河南王妃 博陵崔氏)
- Crown Princess, of the Wei clan of Jingzhao (太子妃 京兆韦氏)
  - Yang You, Emperor Gong (隋恭帝 楊侑, 605 – 14 September 619 ), third son
- Older Lady Liu, of the Liu clan (大刘良娣 刘氏)
  - Yang Tong, Emperor Gong (隋恭帝 楊侗; 600s–619), second son
- Younger Lady Liu, of the Liu clan (小劉良娣 劉氏)
  - Yang Tan, Prince of Yan (燕王 楊倓, 603 – 618), first son
