= Tang West Market Museum =

Museum in Xi'an, China

Coordinates: 34.247061°N 108.908346°E

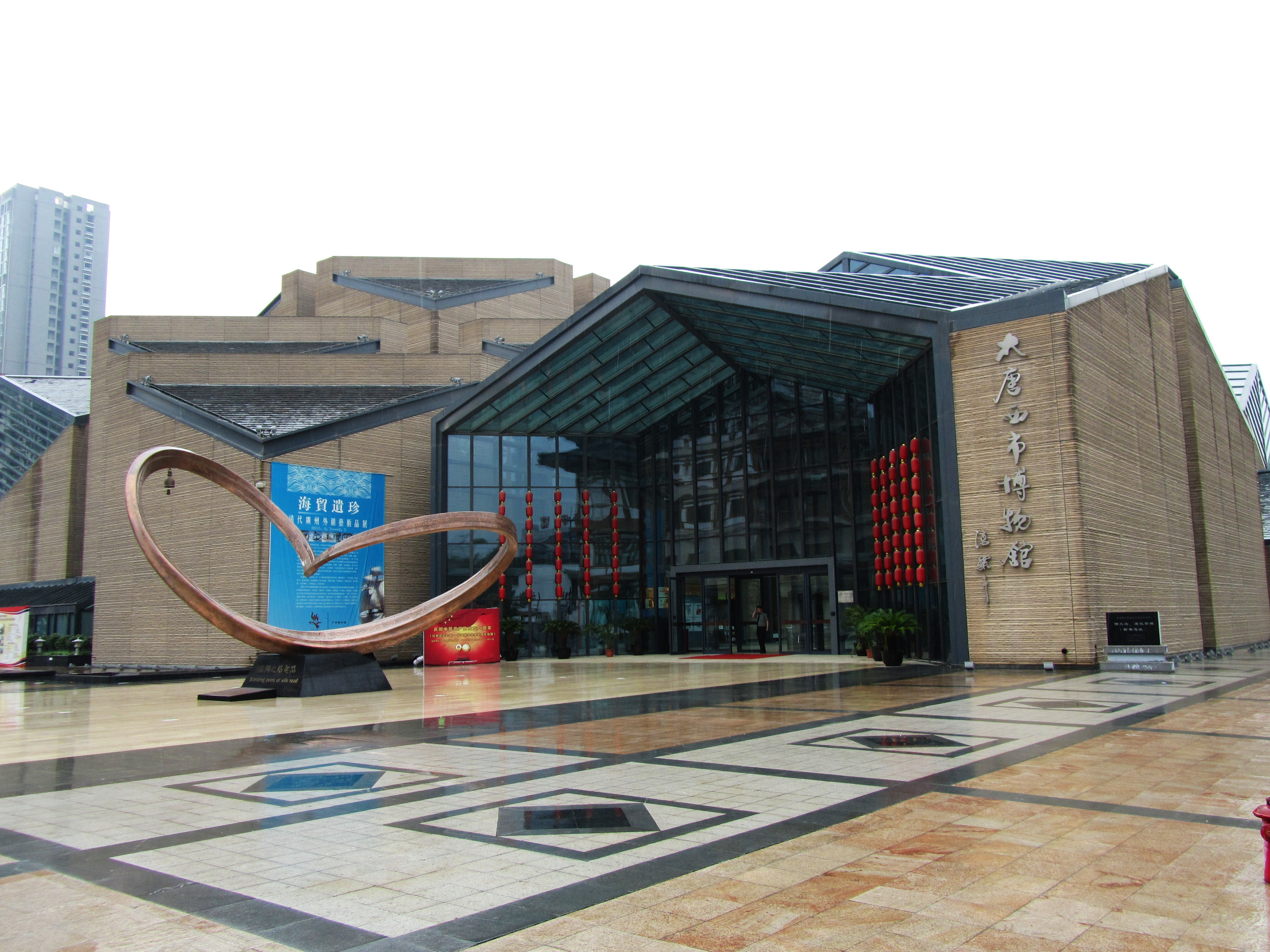
The Tang West Market Museum, in Xi'an.

The Tang West Market Museum (大唐西市博物館) is a museum in the city of Xi'an, Shanxi, China. It houses many artifacts from the Tang dynasty period and the Silk Road. Part of the base of the tomb as well as the epitaph Tomb of An Bei, a Sogdian merchant and official in China in the 6th century CE, are now in the Tang West Market Museum. An Bei followed the Confucian moral principles of filial piety, and practiced Zoroastrianism. It is one of the National first-grade museums of China.

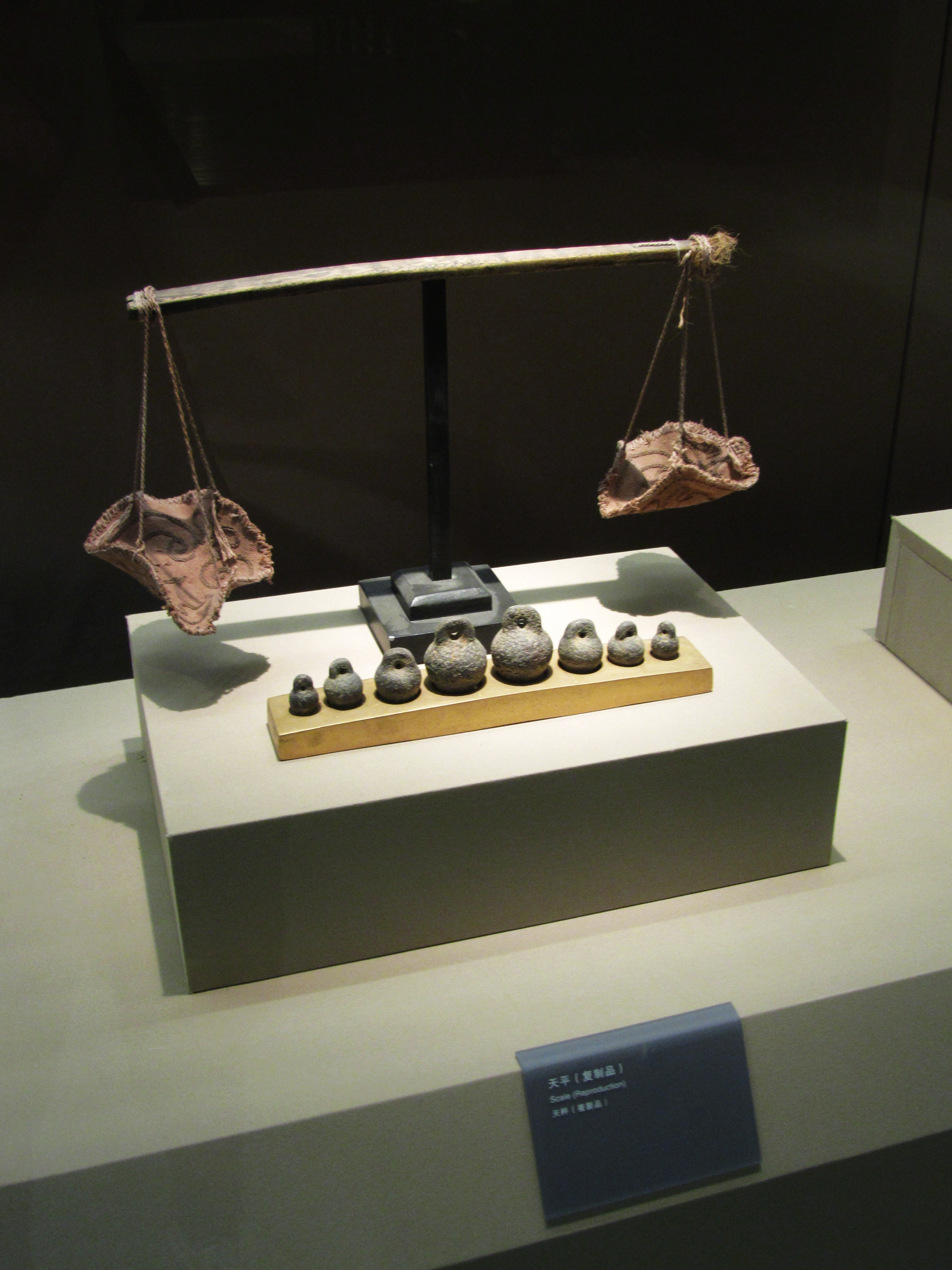
A Tang period scale.

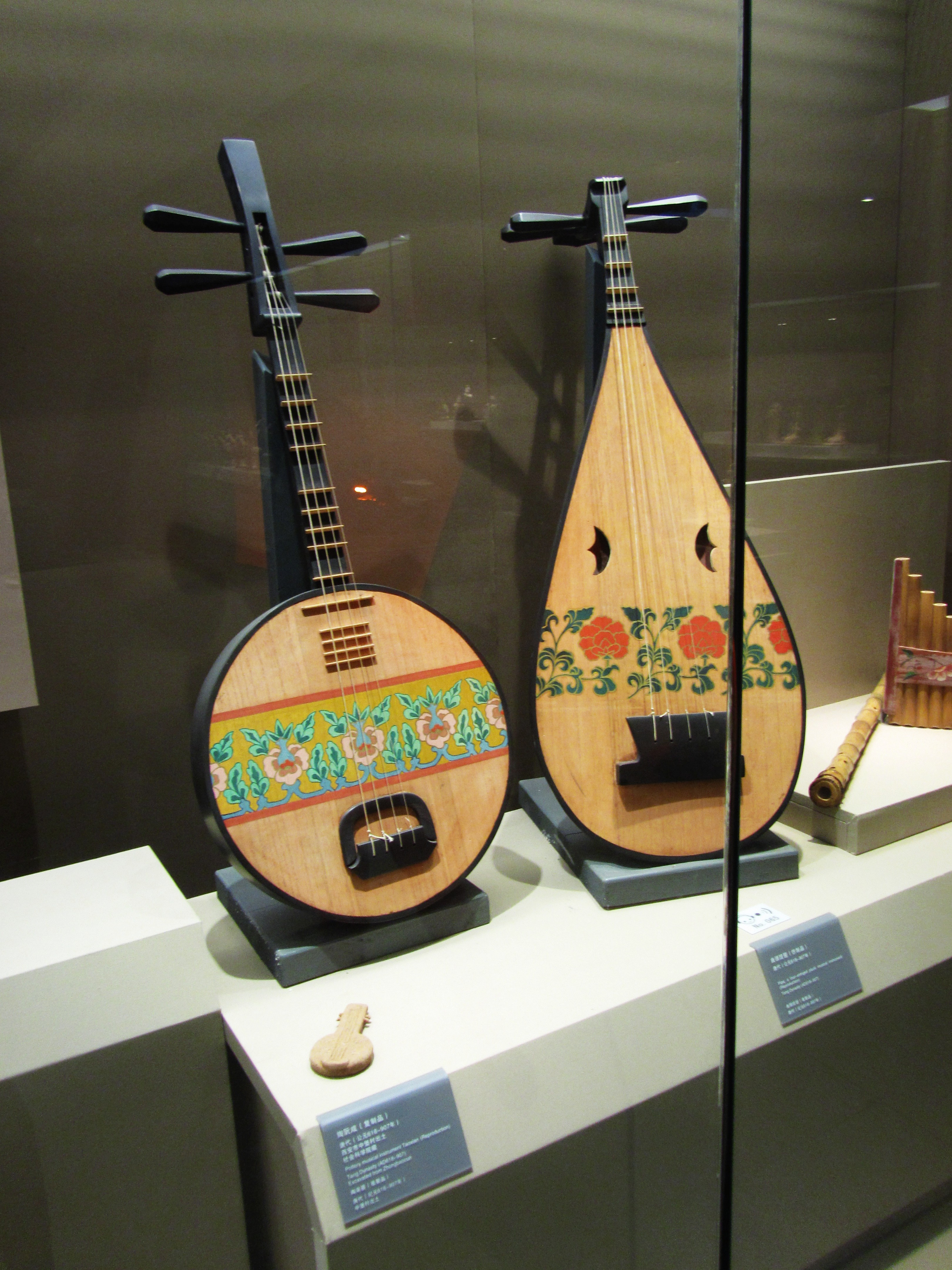
Ruan and Pipa of the Tang dynasty

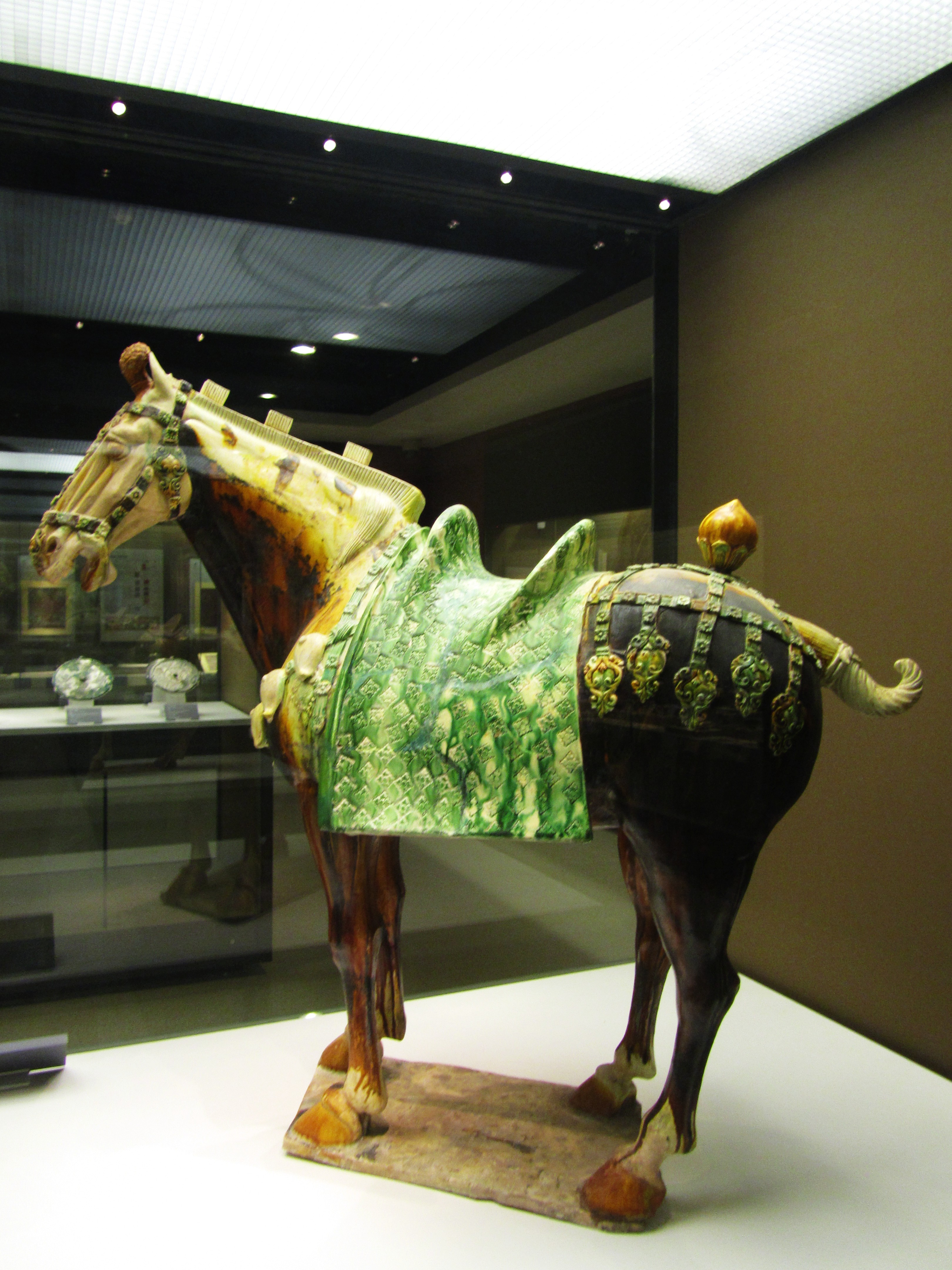
Tang sancai pottery

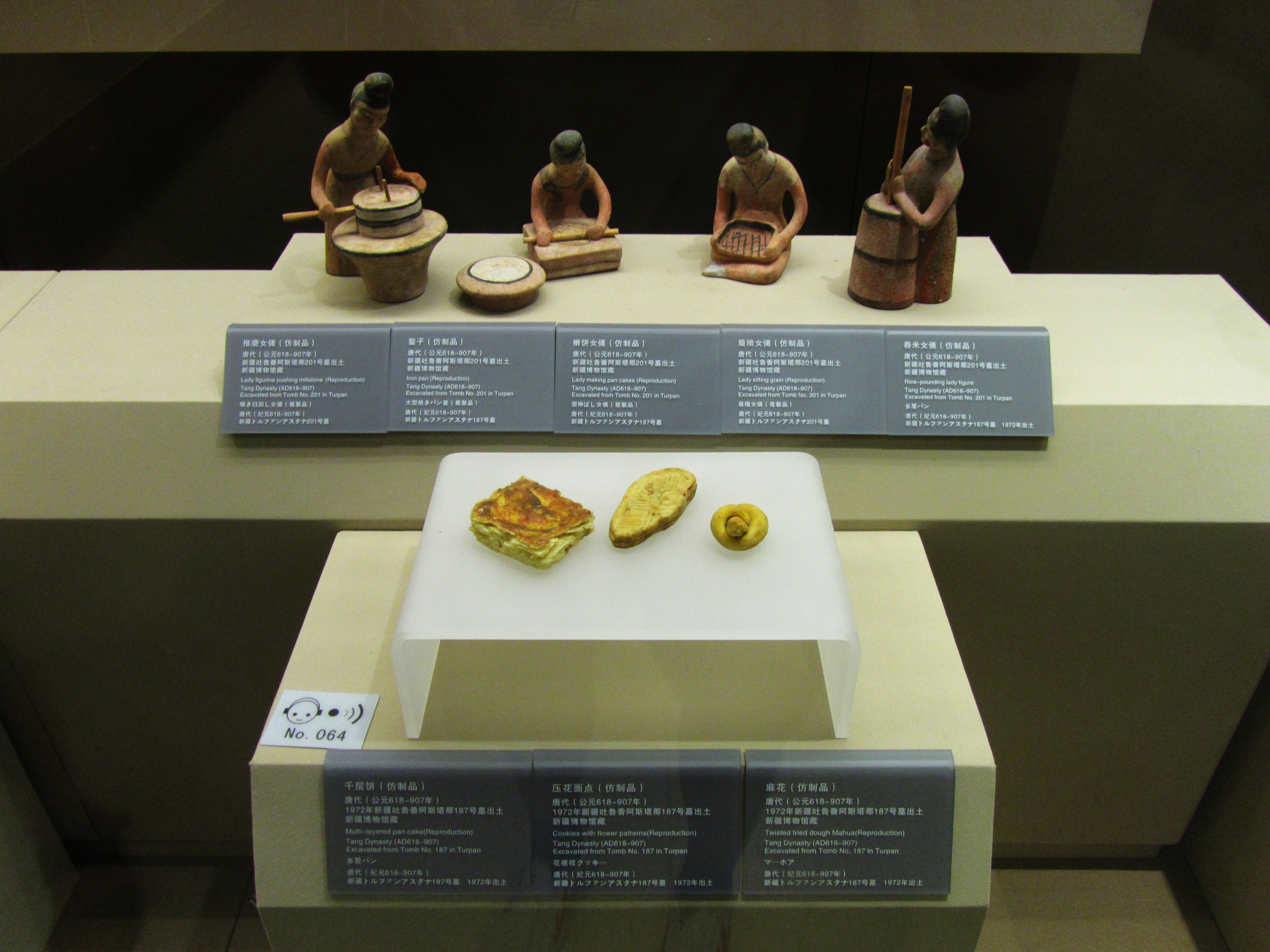
Figurines of ladies of the Tang dynasty
