= Sui dynasty =

Imperial dynasty of China, 581–618

Sui 隋
- 581–618 AD
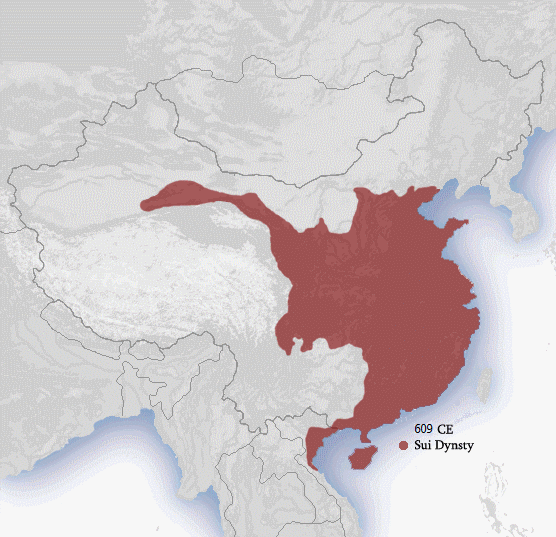
- Sui territory c. 609
- Capital: Daxing (581–605) Luoyang (605–618)
- Common languages: Middle Chinese
- Religion: Buddhism, Taoism, Confucianism, Chinese folk religion, Zoroastrianism
- Government: Monarchy
- Emperor
  - 581–604: Emperor Wen
  - 604–617: Emperor Yang
  - 617–618: Emperor Gong
- Historical era: Post-classical era
  - Ascension of Yang Jian: 4 March 581
  - Abolished by Li Yuan: 23 May 618 AD

Area
- 589: 3,000,000 km^{2} (1,200,000 sq mi)

Population
  - 606 AD census: 46,019,956
- Currency: Chinese coin, Chinese cash
Preceded by
Northern Zhou
Chen dynasty
Western Liang
Succeeded by
Tang dynasty
- Today part of: China; Vietnam

Chinese name
- Chinese: 隋朝
Transcriptions
Standard Mandarin
- Hanyu Pinyin: Suí cháo
- Bopomofo: ㄙㄨㄟˊ ㄔㄠˊ
- Wade–Giles: Sui^{2} chʻao^{2}
- Tongyong Pinyin: Suéi cháo
- IPA: [swěɪ ʈʂʰǎʊ]
Wu
- Romanization: Zoe zau
Yue: Cantonese
- Yale Romanization: Chèuih chìuh
- Jyutping: Ceoi4 ciu4
- IPA: [tsʰɵɥ˩ tsʰiw˩]
Southern Min
- Tâi-lô: Suî-tiâo
Middle Chinese
- Middle Chinese: ziuᴇ ʈˠiᴇu

The Sui dynasty (/swɛɪ/ SWAY) was a Chinese imperial dynasty that ruled from 581 to 618 AD. The re-unification of China proper under the Sui brought the Northern and Southern dynasties era to a close, ending a prolonged period of political division since the War of the Eight Princes. The Sui endeavoured to rebuild the state, re-establishing and reforming many imperial institutions; in so doing, the Sui laid much of the foundation for the subsequent Tang dynasty, which after toppling the Sui would ultimately preside over a new golden age in Chinese history. Often compared to the Qin dynasty (221–206 BC), the Sui likewise unified China after a prolonged period of division, undertook wide-ranging reforms and construction projects to consolidate state power, and collapsed after a brief period.

The dynasty was founded by Yang Jian (Emperor Wen), who had been a member of the military aristocracy that had developed in the northwest during the prolonged period of division. The Sui capital was initially based in Daxing (Chang'an, modern Xi'an), but later moved to Luoyang in 605 AD, which had been re-founded as a planned city. Wen and his successor Emperor Yang undertook various centralising reforms, most notably among them the equal-field system that aimed to reduce economic inequality and improve agricultural productivity, the Five Departments and Six Boards system, which preceded the Three Departments and Six Ministries system, and the standardisation and re-unification of the coinage. The Sui also encouraged the spread of Buddhism throughout the empire. By the dynasty's mid-point, the state experienced considerable prosperity, enjoying a vast agricultural surplus that supported rapid population growth.

The Sui engaged in many construction mega-projects, including the Grand Canal, the extension of the Great Wall, and the reconstruction of Luoyang. The canal linked Luoyang in the east with Chang'an in the west, with the eastern economic and agricultural centres towards Jiangdu (now Yangzhou, Jiangsu) and Yuhang (now Hangzhou), and with the northern frontiers (near modern Beijing). While the initial motivations of the canal were improving grain shipments to the capital and military logistics—including the transportation of troops—the new, reliable inland route would ultimately facilitate domestic trade, the flow of people, and cultural exchange for centuries. These mega-projects were led by an efficient centralised bureaucracy, but forcibly conscripted millions of workers at a heavy human cost.

After a series of military campaigns against the Goguryeo in the Korean Peninsula, which had ended in defeat by 614 AD, the dynasty disintegrated amid popular revolts that culminated in the assassination of Emperor Yang by a minister named Yuwen Huaji in 618 AD. The dynasty, which lasted for only 37 years, was undermined by ambitious wars and construction projects, which overstretched its resources. Particularly, under Emperor Yang, heavy taxation and compulsory labour duties would eventually induce widespread revolts and brief civil war following the fall of the dynasty.

== History ==
=== Foundation and Emperor Wen ===
During the late Northern and Southern dynasties period, the Xianbei-led Northern Zhou conquered the Northern Qi in 577, reunifying northern China. By this time, Yang Jian, a Northern Zhou general who would later found the Sui dynasty, became the regent to the Northern Zhou court. Yang Jian's clan, the Yang clan of Hongnong, had Han origins and claimed descent from the Han dynasty general Yang Zhen, but had intermarried with the Xianbei for generations. Yang Jian's daughter was the Empress Dowager, and her stepson, Emperor Jing of Northern Zhou, was a child. After crushing an army in the eastern provinces, Yang Jian usurped the throne from the Northern Zhou rulers, and became Emperor Wen of Sui. While formerly the Duke of Sui when serving at the Zhou court, where the character 隨 literally means 'to follow', implying loyalty, Emperor Wen created a unique character 隋, morphed from that in his former title, as the name of his new dynasty. In a bloody purge, Wen had 59 Zhou princes eliminated, in contrast to his later reputation as the "Cultured Emperor". Emperor Wen emphasised Han cultural identity during his reign, abolishing the anti-Han policies of Northern Zhou and reclaiming his Han surname of Yang. Having won the support of Confucian scholars who held power in previous Han dynasties (abandoning the nepotism and corruption of the nine-rank system), Emperor Wen initiated a series of reforms aimed at strengthening his empire for the wars that would reunify China.

In his campaign for southern conquest, Emperor Wen assembled thousands of boats to confront the naval forces of the Chen dynasty on the Yangtze. The largest of these ships were very tall, having five layered decks and the capacity for 800 non-crew personnel. They were outfitted with six 50-foot-long booms that were used to swing and damage enemy ships, or to pin them down so that Sui marine troops could use act-and-board techniques. Besides employing Xianbei and other Chinese ethnic groups for the fight against Chen, Emperor Wen also employed the service of people from southeastern Sichuan, which Sui had recently conquered.

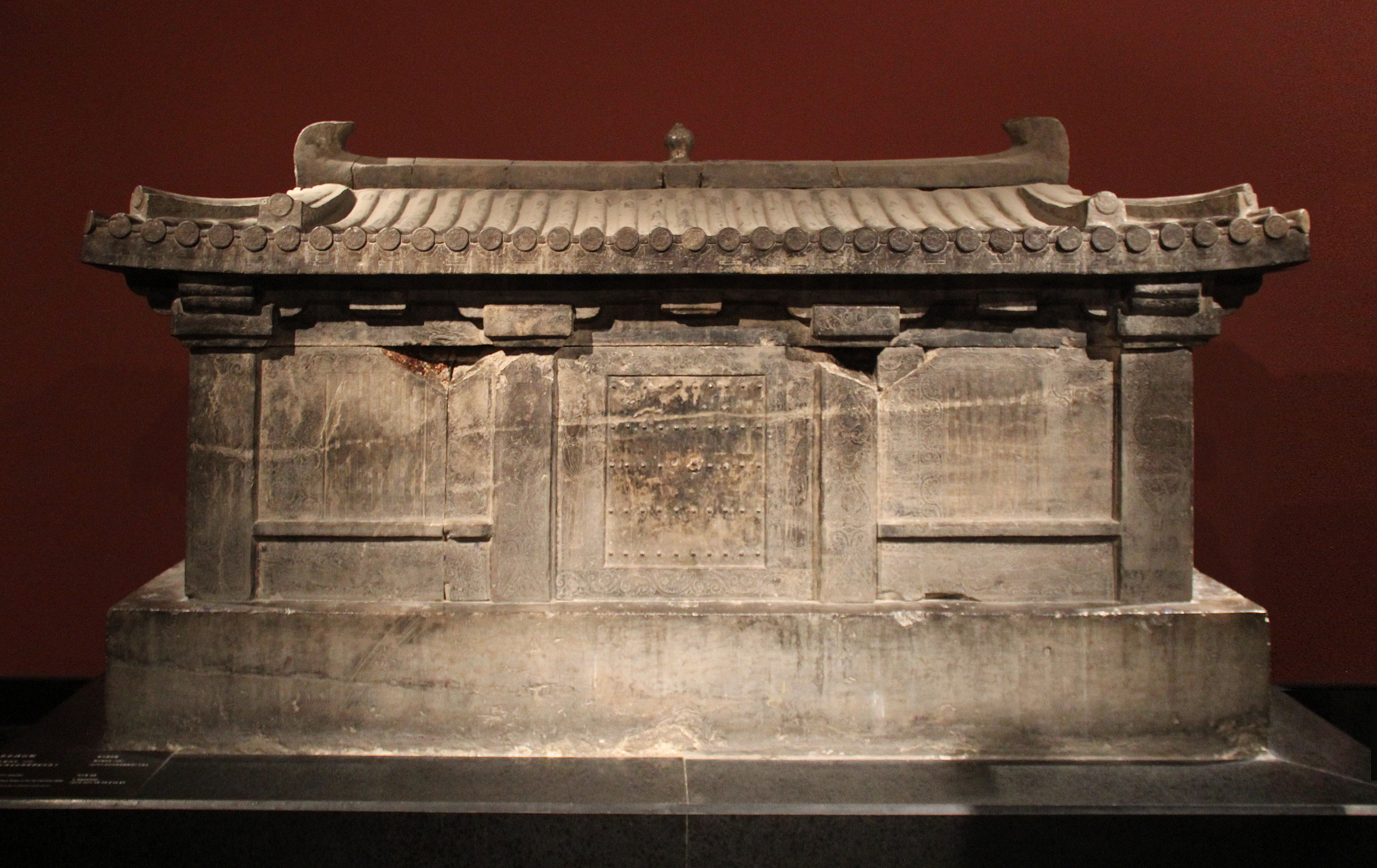
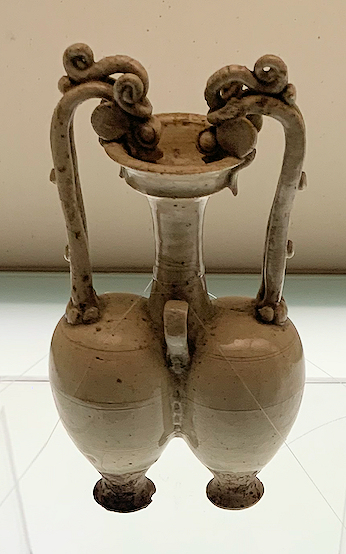
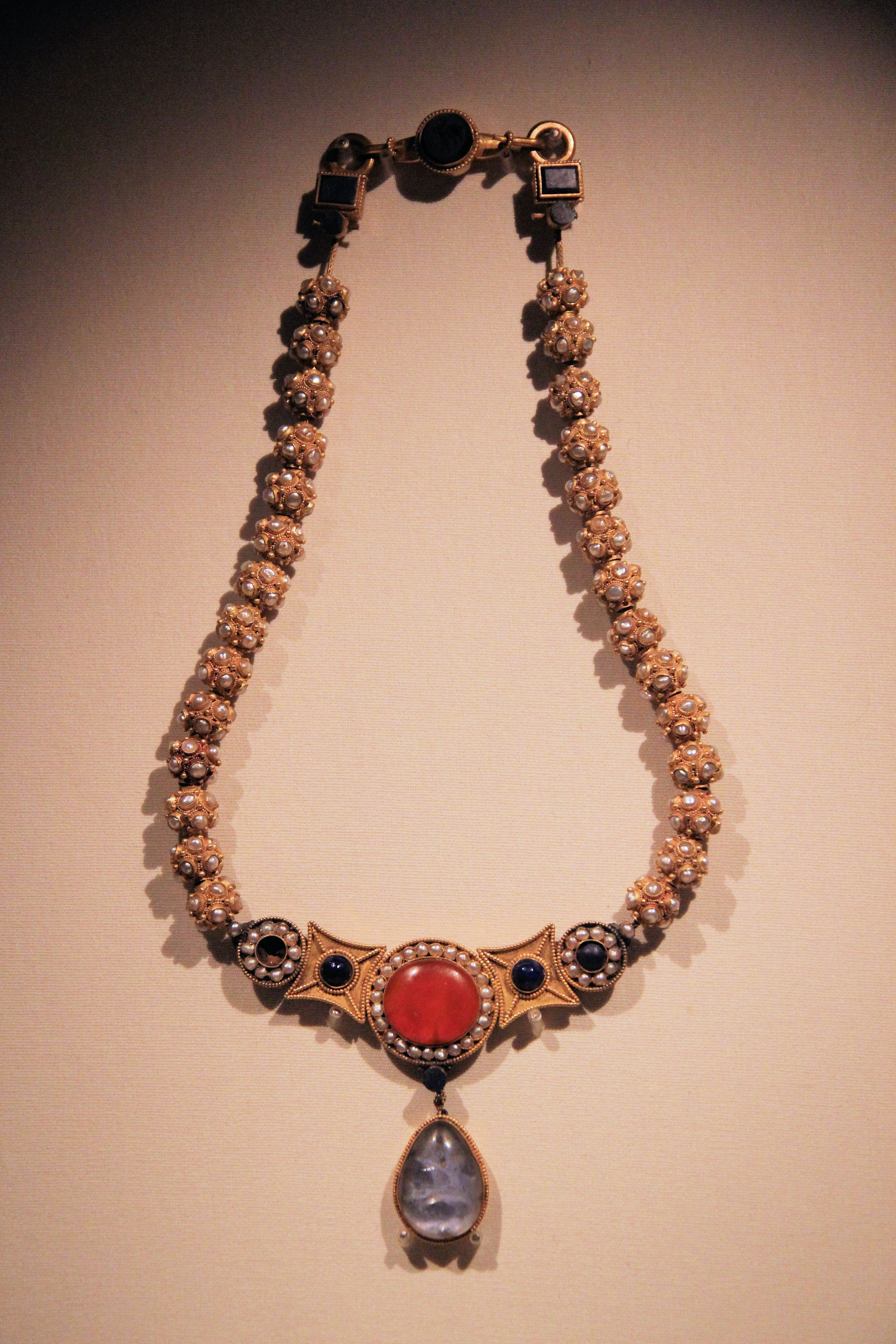
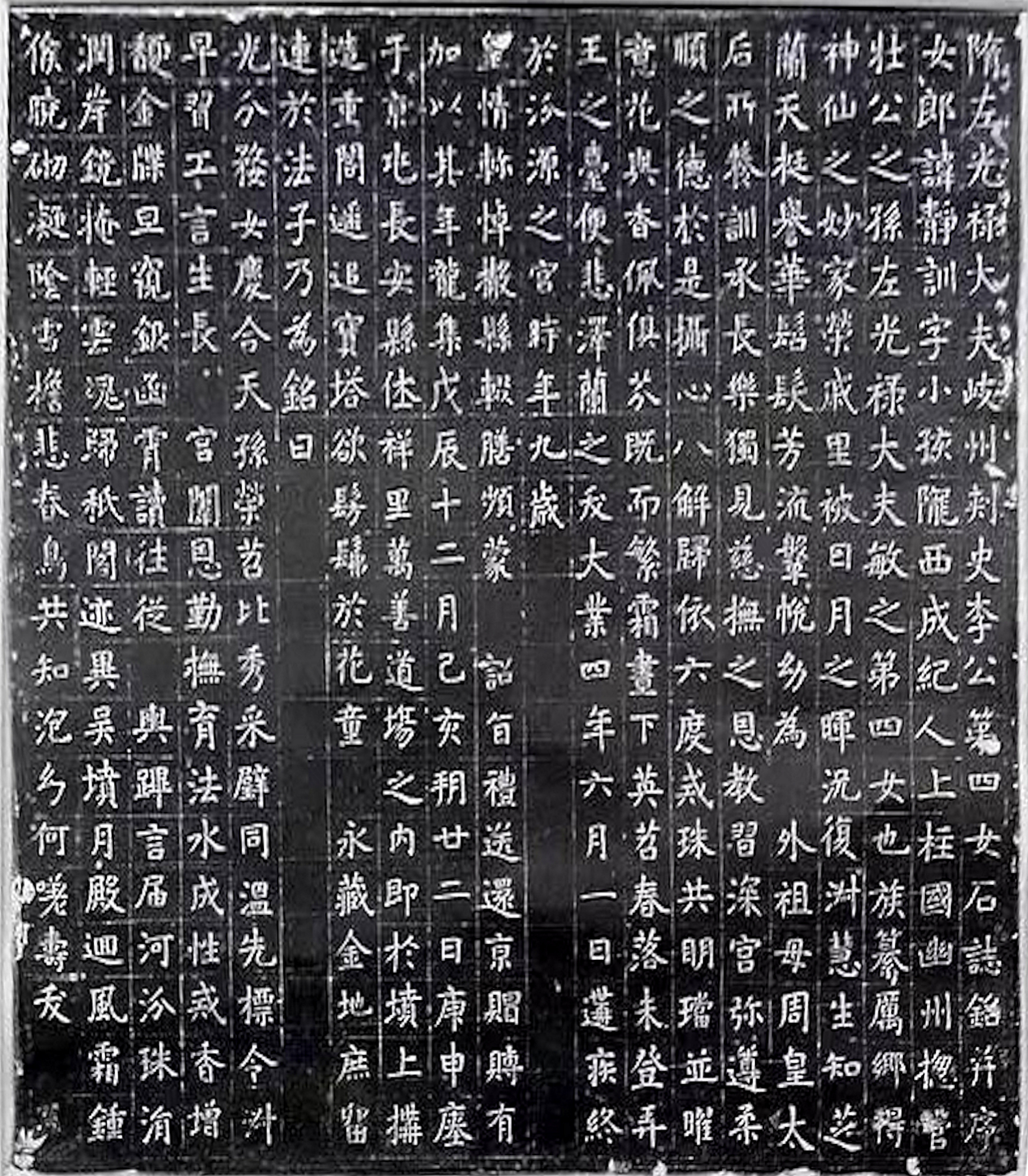
Stone sarcophagus of Li Jingxun (Beilin Museum, Xi'an), a young Sui dynasty princess who died in 608 AD, with some of the artefacts and the epitaph.

In 588, the Sui had amassed 518,000 troops along the northern bank of the Yangtze River, stretching from Sichuan to the East China Sea. The Chen dynasty could not withstand such an assault. By 589, Sui troops entered Jiankang (now Nanjing) and the last emperor of Chen surrendered. The city was razed to the ground, while Sui troops escorted Chen nobles back north, where the northern aristocrats became fascinated with everything the south had to provide culturally and intellectually.

Although Emperor Wen was famous for bankrupting the state treasury with warfare and construction projects, he made many improvements to infrastructure during his early reign. He established granaries as sources of food and as a means to regulate market prices from the taxation of crops, much like the earlier Han dynasty. The large agricultural surplus supported rapid growth of population to a historical peak, which was only surpassed during the reign of Emperor Xuanzong of Tang more than a century later.

The capital of Daxing (Chang'an, modern Xi'an), while situated in the militarily secure heartland of Guanzhong, was remote from the economic centres to the east and south of the empire. Emperor Wen initiated the construction of the Grand Canal, with completion of the first (and the shortest) route that directly linked Chang'an to the Yellow River. Later, Emperor Yang enormously enlarged the scale of the Grand Canal construction.

Sui divisions under Yang (western regions not depicted)

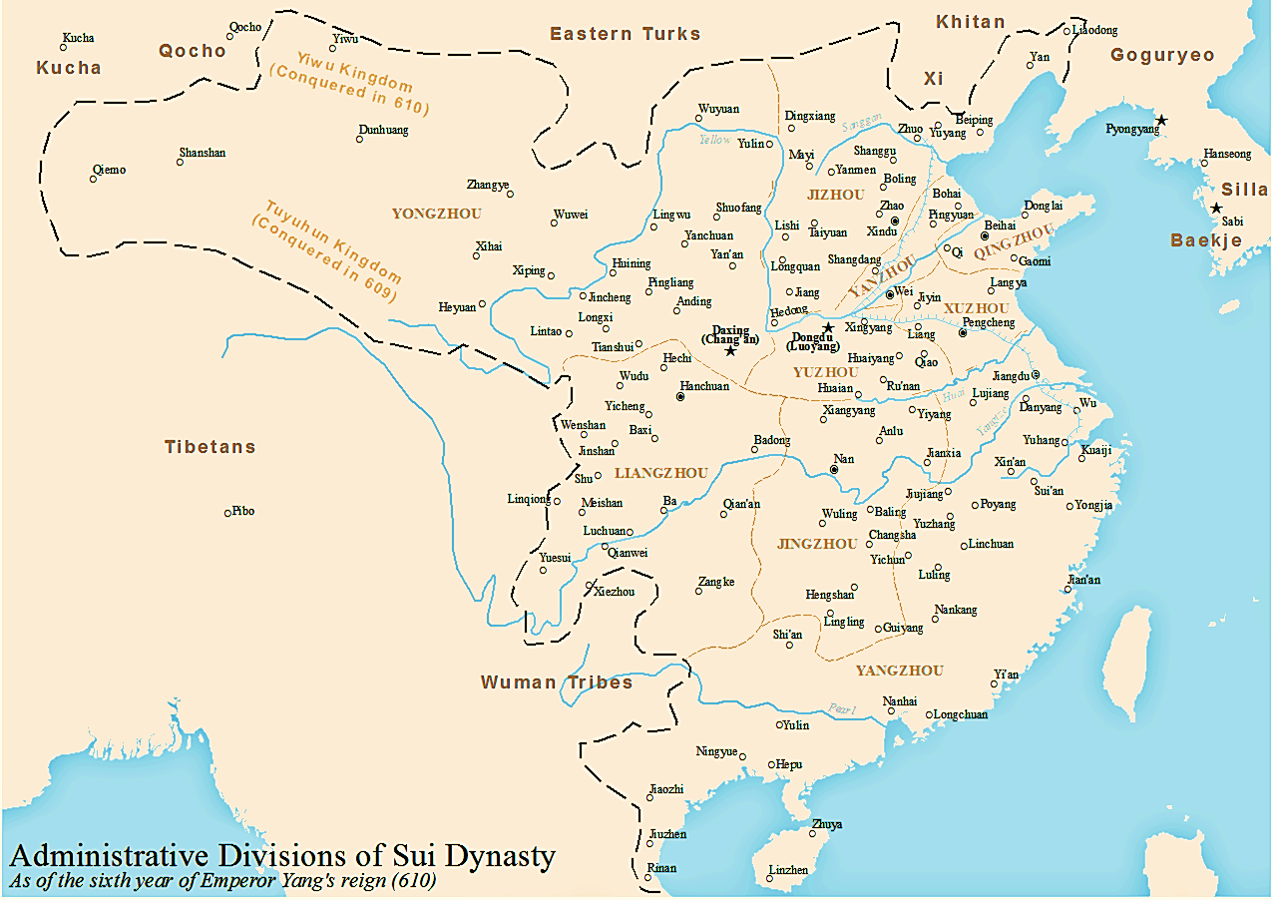
Administrative divisions c. 610

Externally, the emerging Turkic Khaganate in the north posed a major threat to the newly founded dynasty. With Emperor Wen's diplomatic manoeuvre, the Khaganate split into Eastern and Western halves. Later the Great Wall was consolidated to further secure the northern territory. In Emperor Wen's late years, the first war with Goguryeo, ended with defeat. Nevertheless, the celebrated "Reign of Kaihuang" (era name of Emperor Wen) was considered by historians as one of the apexes in the two millennium imperial period of Chinese history.

The Sui emperors were from the northwest military aristocracy, and they cited the Han Hongnong Yangshi clan as their ancestors. They emphasised their Han ancestry, and claimed descent from the Han official Yang Zhen. The New Book of Tang traces their patrilineal ancestry to the Zhou dynasty kings via the Dukes of Jin. The Li of Zhaojun and the Lu of Fanyang hailed from Shandong and were related to the Liu clan, which was also linked to the Hongnong Yangshi of and other clans of Guanlong.

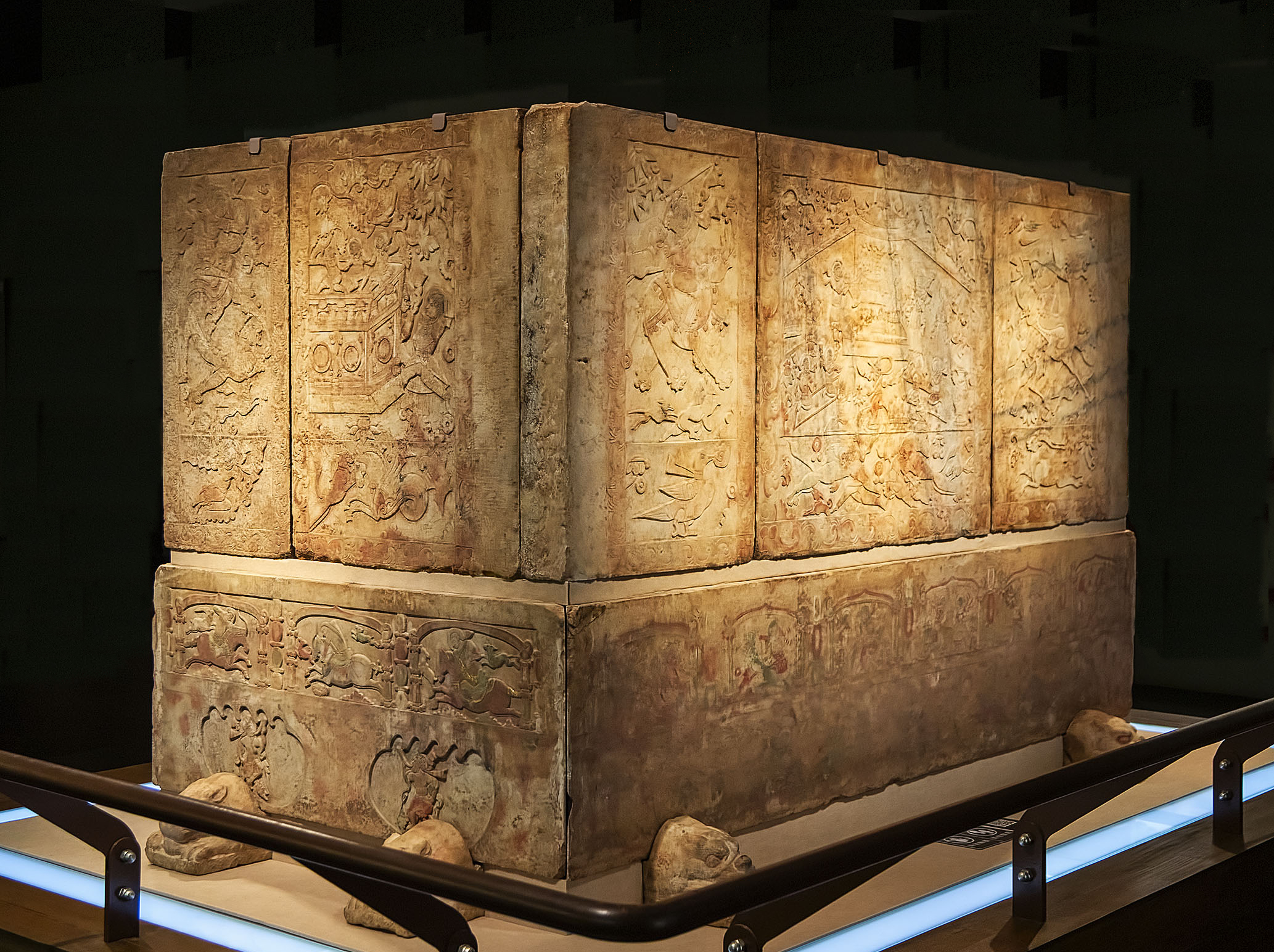
Tomb of Yu Hong, a Sogdian merchant buried in Taiyuan in 592. Shanxi Museum.

The Yang of Hongnong, Jia of Hedong, Xiang of Henei, and Wang of Taiyuan from the Tang dynasty were later claimed as ancestors by Song dynasty lineages. Information about these major political events in China were somehow filtered west and reached the Byzantine Empire, the continuation of the Roman Empire in the east. From Turkic peoples of Central Asia the Eastern Romans derived a new name for China after the older Sinae and Serica: Taugast (Old Turkic: Tabghach), during its Northern Wei (386–535) period. The 7th-century Byzantine historian Theophylact Simocatta wrote a generally accurate depiction of the reunification of China by Emperor Wen of the Sui dynasty, with the conquest of the rival Chen dynasty in southern China. Simocatta correctly placed these events within the reign period of Byzantine ruler Maurice. Simocatta also provided cursory information about the geography of China, its division by the Yangzi River and its capital Khubdan (from Old Turkic Khumdan, i.e. Chang'an) along with its customs and culture, deeming its people "idolatrous" but wise in governance. He noted that the ruler was named "Taisson", which he claimed meant "Son of God", perhaps Chinese Tianzi (Son of Heaven) or even the name of the contemporary ruler Emperor Taizong of Tang.

=== Emperor Yang and re-conquest of Vietnam ===
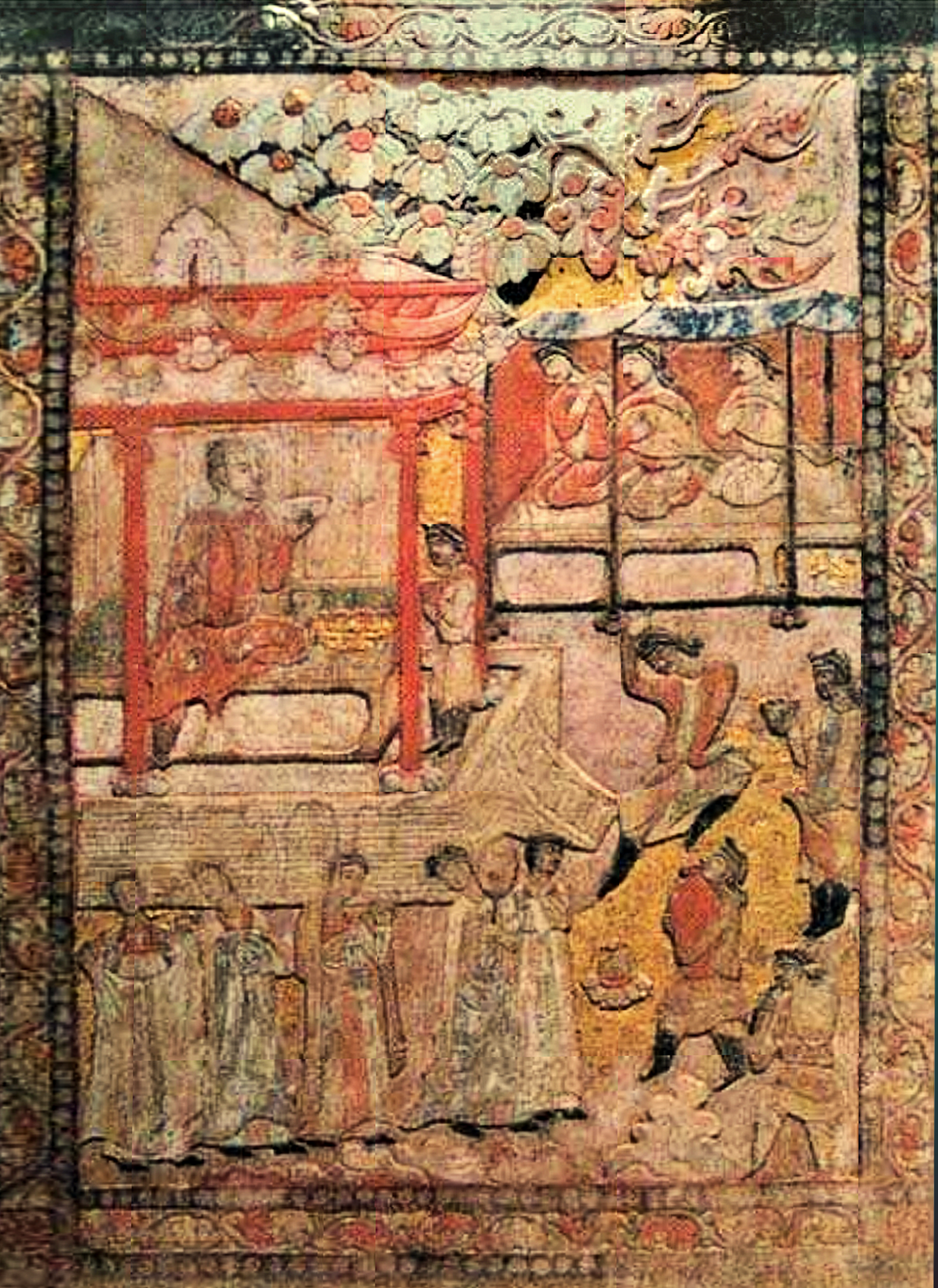
Tomb of An Bei panel showing a Sui dynasty banquet with Sogdian whirl dance and music, 589

Emperor Yang of Sui (569–618) ascended the throne after his father's death, possibly by murder. He further extended the empire, but unlike his father, did not seek to gain support from the nomads. Instead, he restored Confucian education and the Confucian examination system for bureaucrats. By supporting educational reforms, he lost the support of the nomads. He also started many expensive construction projects such as the Grand Canal, and became embroiled in several costly wars. Between these policies, invasions into China from Turkic nomads, and his growing life of decadent luxury at the expense of the peasantry, he lost public support and was eventually assassinated by his own ministers.

Both Emperors Yang and Wen sent military expeditions into Vietnam as Annam in northern Vietnam had been incorporated into the Chinese empire over 600 years earlier during the Han dynasty (202 BC – 220 AD). However the Kingdom of Champa in central Vietnam became a major counterpart to Chinese invasions to its north. According to Ebrey, Walthall, and Palais, these invasions became known as the Linyi-Champa Campaign (602–605).

The Hanoi area formerly held by the Han and Jin dynasties was easily retaken from the Early Lý dynasty ruler Lý Phật Tử in 602. A few years later the Sui army pushed farther south and was attacked by troops on war elephants from Champa in southern Vietnam. The Sui army feigned retreat and dug pits to trap the elephants, lured the Champan troops to attack then used crossbows against the elephants causing them to turn around and trample their own soldiers. Although Sui troops were victorious many succumbed to disease as northern soldiers did not have immunity to tropical diseases such as malaria.

=== War with Goguryeo ===
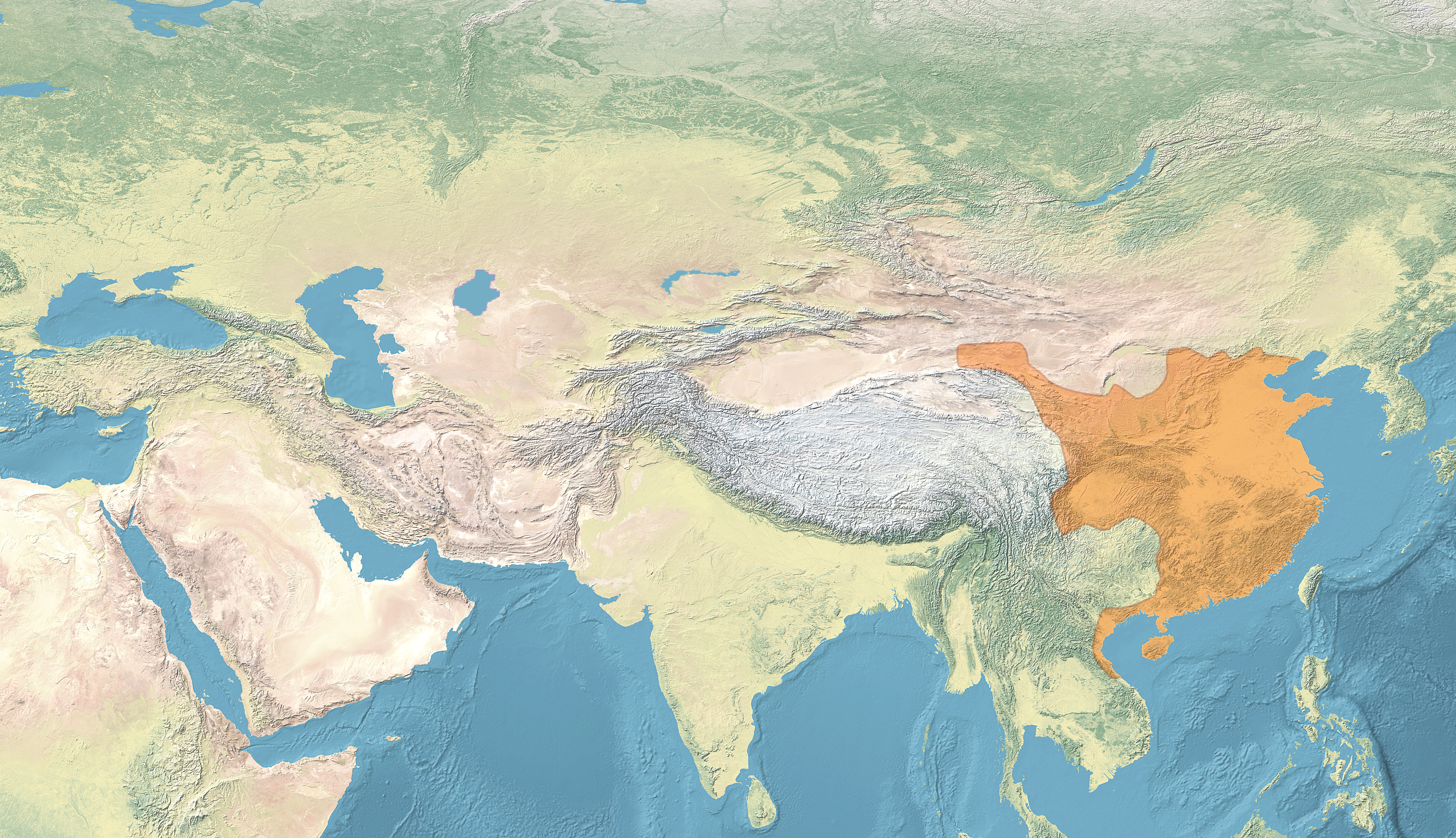
The Sui dynasty and main Asian polities circa 600.

The Sui dynasty led a series of massive expeditions to invade Goguryeo, one of the Three Kingdoms of Korea. Emperor Yang conscripted many soldiers for the campaign. This army was so enormous it recorded in historical texts that it took 30 days for all the armies to exit their last rallying point near Shanhaiguan before invading Goguryeo. In one instance the soldiers—both conscripted and paid—listed over 3000 warships, up to 1.15 million infantry, 50,000 cavalry, 5000 artillery, and more. The army stretched to 1000 li, or about 410 km (250 mi), across rivers and valleys, over mountains and hills. Each of the four military expeditions ended in failure, incurring a substantial financial and manpower deficit from which the Sui would never recover.

=== Collapse ===
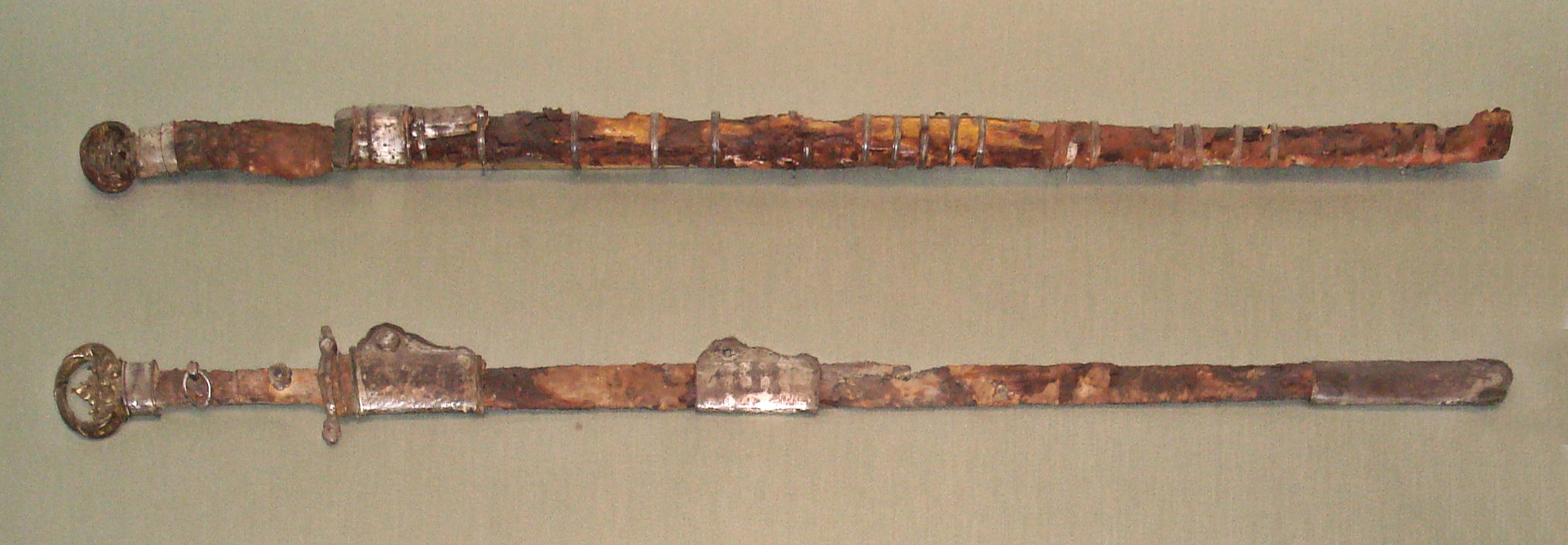
Chinese swords of the Sui dynasty dated c. 600, found near Luoyang. The P-shaped furniture of the bottom sword's scabbard is similar to and may have been derived from sword scabbards of the Sarmatians and Sassanians.

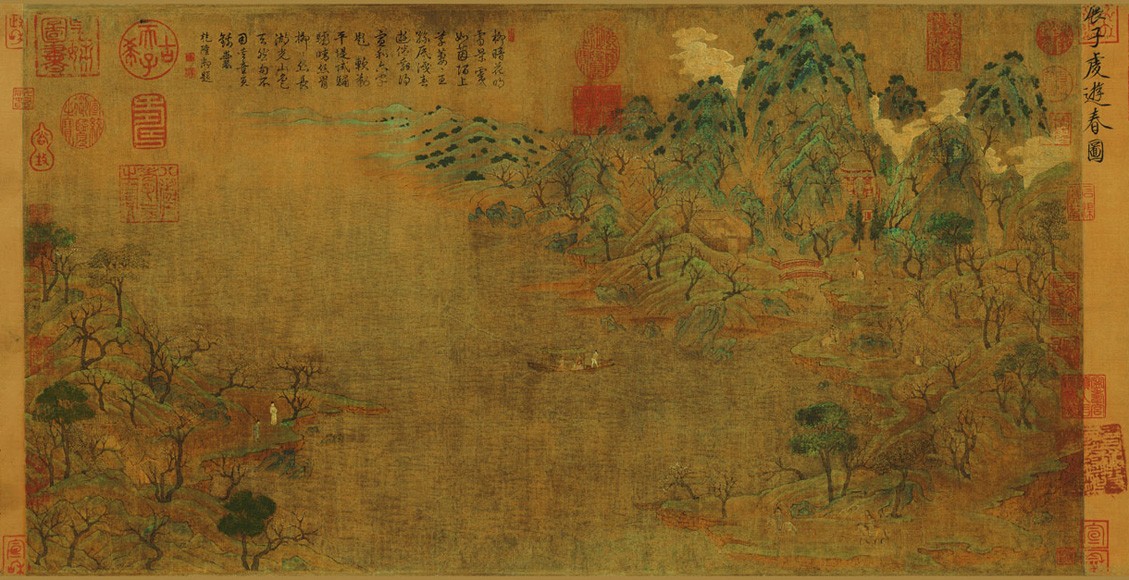
Strolling About in Spring, by Sui-era artist Zhan Ziqian

One of the major work projects undertaken by the Sui was construction activities along the Great Wall of China; but this, along with other large projects, strained the economy and angered the resentful workforce employed. During the last few years of the Sui dynasty, the rebellion that rose against it took many of China's able-bodied men from rural farms and other occupations, which in turn damaged the agricultural base and the economy further. Men would deliberately break their limbs in order to avoid military conscription, calling the practice "propitious paws" and "fortunate feet." Later, after the fall of Sui, in the year 642, Emperor Taizong of Tang made an effort to eradicate this practice by issuing a decree of a stiffer punishment for those who were found to deliberately injure and heal themselves.

Although the Sui dynasty was relatively short (581–618), much was accomplished during its tenure. The Grand Canal was one of the main accomplishments. It was extended north from the Hangzhou region across the Yangtze to Yangzhou, and then northwest to the region of Luoyang. Again, like the Great Wall works, the massive conscription of labour and allocation of resources for the Grand Canal project resulted in challenges for Sui dynastic continuity. The eventual fall of the Sui dynasty was also due to the many losses caused by the failed military campaigns against Goguryeo. It was after these defeats and losses that the country was left in ruins and rebels soon took control of the government. Emperor Yang was assassinated in 618. He had gone South after being threatened by various rebel groups and was killed by his Yuwen clan advisors. Meanwhile, in the North, the aristocrat Li Yuan (李淵) held an uprising after which he ended up ascending the throne to become Emperor Gaozu of Tang.

There were dukedoms for the offspring of the royal families of the Zhou dynasty, Sui dynasty, and Tang dynasty in the Later Jin (Five Dynasties). This practice was referred to as èrwáng-sānkè (二王三恪).

== Culture ==
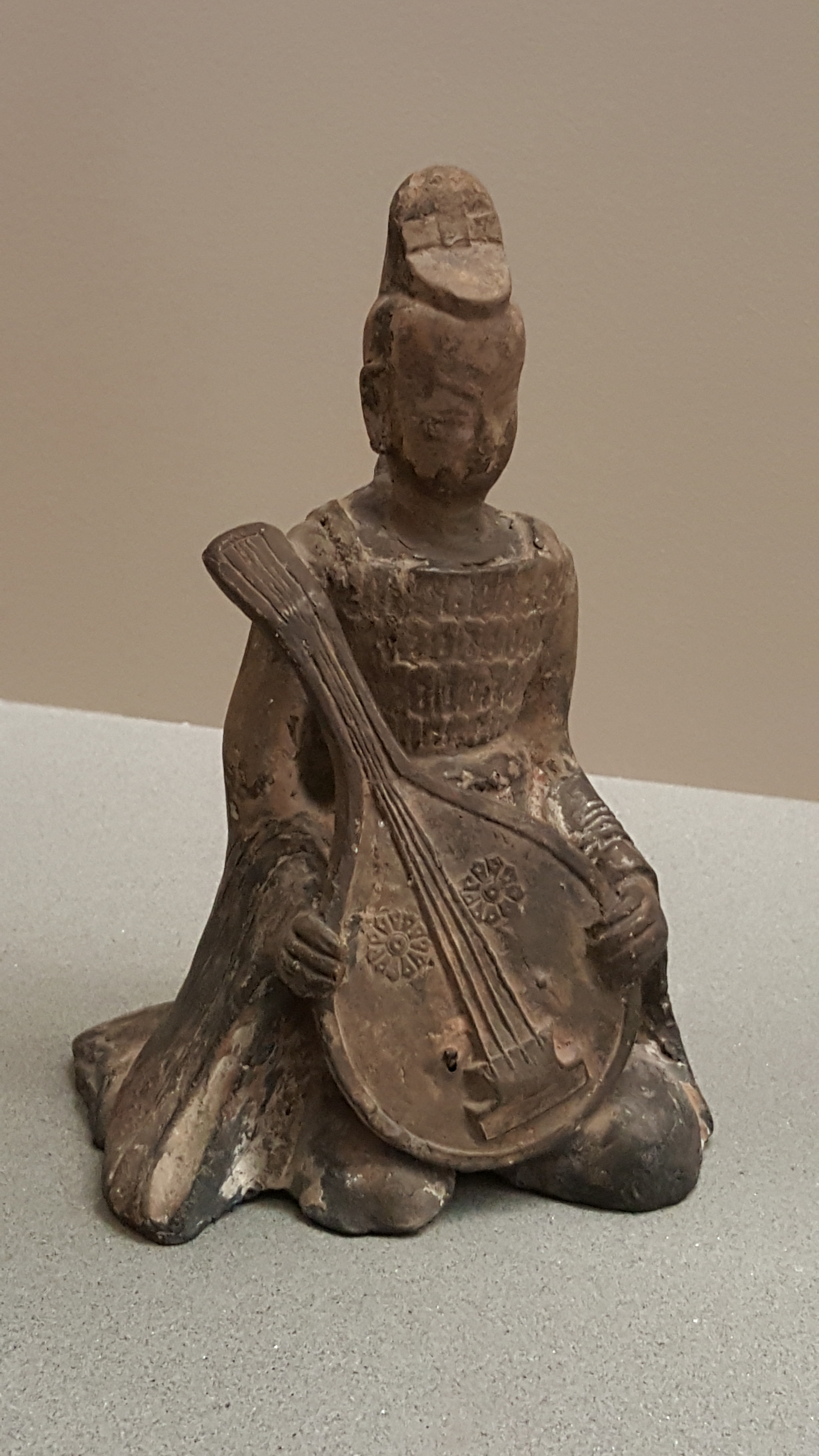
Sui statuette of a pipa player

Although the Sui dynasty was relatively short-lived, in terms of culture, it represents a transition from the preceding ages, and many cultural developments which can be seen to be incipient during the Sui dynasty later were expanded and consolidated during the ensuing Tang dynasty, and later ages. This includes not only the major public works initiated, such as the Great Wall and the Great Canal, but also the political system developed by Sui, which was adopted by Tang with little initial change other than at the top of the political hierarchy. Other cultural developments of the Sui dynasty included religion and literature, particular examples being Buddhism and poetry.

Rituals and sacrifices were conducted by the Sui.

=== Taoism ===
The Sui court pursued a pro-Taoist policy. The first reign of the dynasty saw the state promoting the Northern Louguan school of Taoism, while the second reign instead promoted the Southern Shangqing school of Taoism, possibly due to Emperor Yang's preference for Southern culture.

=== Buddhism ===
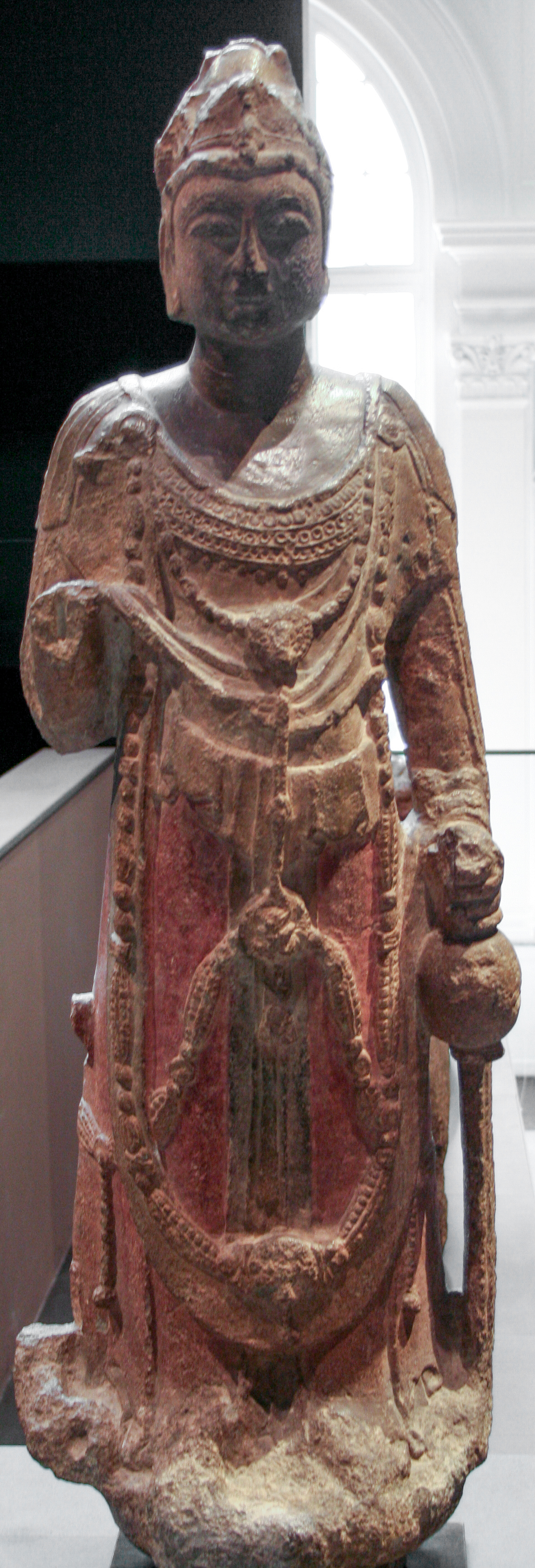
A Sui stone statue of the Avalokitesvara boddhisattva (Guanyin)

Buddhism was popular during the Sixteen Kingdoms and Northern and Southern dynasties period that preceded the Sui dynasty, spreading from India through Kushan Afghanistan into China during the Late Han period. Buddhism gained prominence during the period when central political control was limited. Buddhism created a unifying cultural force that uplifted the people out of war and into the Sui dynasty. In many ways, Buddhism was responsible for the rebirth of culture in China under the Sui dynasty.

While early Buddhist teachings were acquired from Sanskrit sutras, it was during the late Six dynasties and Sui dynasty that local Chinese schools of Buddhist thoughts started to flourish. Most notably, Zhiyi founded the Tiantai school, and completed the Great treatise on Concentration and Insight, within which he taught the principle of "Three Thousand Realms in a Single moment of Life" as the essence of Buddhist teaching outlined in the Lotus Sutra.

Emperor Wen and his empress had converted to Buddhism to legitimise imperial authority over China and the conquest of Chen. The emperor presented himself as a Cakravartin king, a Buddhist monarch who would use military force to defend the Buddhist faith. In the year 601 AD, Emperor Wen had relics of the Buddha distributed to temples throughout China, with edicts that expressed his goals, "all the people within the Four Seas may, without exception, develop enlightenment and together cultivate fortunate karma, bringing it to pass that present existences will lead to happy future lives, that the sustained creation of good causation will carry us one and all up to wondrous enlightenment". Ultimately, this act was an imitation of Ashoka, a ruler of the ancient Maurya Empire in India.

=== Confucianism ===
Confucian philosopher Wang Tong wrote and taught during the Sui dynasty, and even briefly held office as Secretary of Shuzhou. His most famous (as well as only surviving) work, the Explanation of the Mean (Zhongshuo, 中說) was compiled shortly after his death in 617.

=== Poetry ===
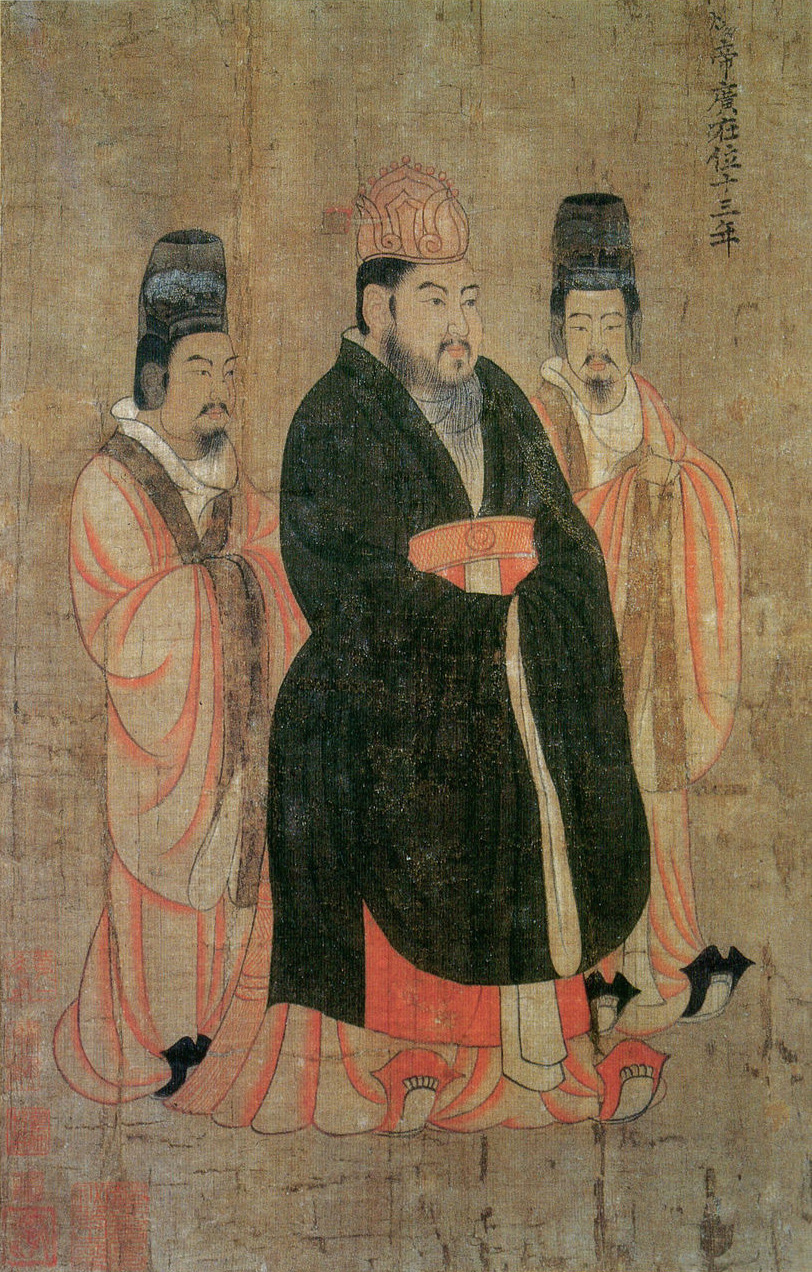
Yang Guang depicted as Emperor of Sui. Painted by Yan Liben (600–673)

Although poetry continued to be written, and certain poets rose in prominence while others disappeared from the landscape, the brief Sui dynasty, in terms of the development of Chinese poetry, lacks distinction, though it nonetheless represents a continuity between the Six Dynasties and the poetry of Tang. Sui dynasty poets include Yang Guang (580–618), who was the last Sui emperor (and a sort of poetry critic); and also, the Lady Hou, one of his consorts.

== Rulers ==
Posthumous name	Birth name	Reign	Era name
Wéndì (文帝)	Yáng Jiān (楊堅)	581–604	Kāihuáng (開皇) 581–600; Rénshòu (仁壽) 601–604
Yángdì (煬帝) or Míngdì (明帝)	Yáng Guǎng (楊廣)	604–618 (Note: In 617, the rebel general Li Yuan (the later Emperor Gaozu of Tang) declared Emperor Yang's grandson Yang You emperor (as Emperor Gong) and "honored" Emperor Yang as Taishang Huang (retired emperor) at the western capital Daxing (Chang'an), but only the commanderies under Li's control recognized this change; for the other commanderies under Sui control, Emperor Yang was still regarded as emperor, not as retired emperor. After news of Emperor Yang's death in 618 reached Daxing and the eastern capital Luoyang, Li Yuan deposed Emperor Gong and took the throne himself, establishing the Tang dynasty, but the Sui officials at Luoyang declared Emperor Gong's brother Yang Tong (later also known as Emperor Gong during the brief reign of Wang Shichong over the region as the emperor of a brief Zheng (鄭) state) emperor. Meanwhile, Yuwen Huaji, the general under whose leadership the plot to kill Emperor Yang was carried out, declared Emperor Wen's grandson Yang Hao emperor but killed Yang Hao later in 618 and declared himself emperor of a brief Xu (許) state. As Yang Hao was completely under Yuwen's control and only "reigned" briefly, he is not usually regarded as a legitimate emperor of Sui, while Yang Tong's legitimacy is more recognized by historians but still disputed.)	Dàyè (大業) 605–618
Gōngdì (恭帝)	Yang You	617–618	Yìníng (義寧) 617–618
Gōngdì (恭帝)	Yang Tong	618–619	Huángtài (皇泰) 618–619

=== Family tree ===
Sui dynasty

Dugu Xin 獨孤信
SUI DYNASTY
Yang Jian 楊坚 541–604; Wendi 文帝; 581–604	Dugu Qieluo 獨孤伽羅 544–602; Empress Xian 獻皇后	Duchess Dugu	Li Bing 李昺 d. 572; Duke of Tang 唐國公
1	2	3	4	5	TANG DYNASTY
Yang Yong 楊勇 d. 604; Prince of Fangling 房陵王	Yang Guang 楊廣 569–618; Yangdi 煬帝; 604–617	Yang Jun 楊俊; 571–600; Prince of Qin 秦孝王	Yang Xiu 楊秀; 573–618	Yang Liang 楊諒; 575–605	Li Yuan 李淵 566–635; Gaozu 高祖; 618–626
1	2	3
Yang Zhao 楊昭; 584–606; Cr.Prince Yuande 元德太子	Yang Jian 楊暕; 585–618; Prince of Qi 齊王	Yang Gao 楊杲 607–618; Prince of Zhao 趙王	Yang Hao 楊浩 d. 618; Prince of Qin 秦王; 618?
1	2	3
Yang Tan 楊倓; 603–618; Prince of Yan 燕王	Yang Tong 楊侗 605–619; Gongdi 恭帝; 618–619	Yang You 楊侑 605–619; Gongdi 恭帝; 617–618

== See also ==
- Anji Bridge
- Chinese sovereign
- List of tributaries of Imperial China
- Volcanic winter of 536

== Notes ==
Preceded by Northern and Southern dynasties	Dynasties in Chinese history 581–619	Succeeded by Tang dynasty
