= Yang Tong =

Emperor of the Sui dynasty from 618 to 619

Emperor Gong of Sui 隋恭帝

Emperor of the Sui dynasty (Eastern)
- Reign: 22 June 618 – 23 May 619
- Successor: None (dynasty abolished)
- Born: Between 603 and 605
- Died: June or July 619
Names
- Family name: Yang (楊, Yáng); Given name: Tong (侗, Tóng)
Posthumous name
- Emperor Gōng (恭皇帝; conferred by Wang Shichong)
- House: Yang
- Dynasty: Sui
- Father: Yang Zhao, Crown Prince Yuande
- Mother: Consort Liu

Yang Tong (Chinese: 楊侗; 600s – June or July 619), known in traditional histories by his princely title of Prince of Yue (越王) or by his era name as Lord Huangtai (皇泰主), also known by his posthumous name as the Emperor Gong of Sui (隋恭帝), courtesy name Renjin (仁謹), was an emperor of China's Sui dynasty. During the disturbances that permeated throughout the Sui state late in the dynasty's history, his grandfather Emperor Yang left him in charge of the eastern capital Luoyang, and after Emperor Yang was killed by the general Yuwen Huaji in 618, the Sui officials in Luoyang declared Yang Tong emperor. However, soon one of those officials, Wang Shichong, seized power, and in 619 had Yang Tong yield the throne to him, ending the Sui dynasty. Soon, he was killed on Wang's orders.

== During Emperor Yang's reign ==
It was not recorded when Yang Tong was born, except that his elder brother Yang Tan (楊倓) was born in 603 and his younger brother Yang You was born in 605. He was the second of three sons of Yang Zhao, Emperor Yang's son and crown prince. His mother was Yang Zhao's concubine, Consort Liu.

In 606, Yang Zhao died. According to Confucian principles of succession, Yang Tong's younger brother Yang You, would have been considered Yang Zhao's heir apparent and successor, as Yang You was born of Yang Zhao's wife Crown Princess Wei. However, Emperor Yang did not create any son of Yang Zhao crown prince to replace Yang Zhao, but left the matters of succession ambiguous between them and Yang Zhao's younger brother Yang Jian the Prince of Qi. He did, however, create Yang Tong and his brothers imperial princes, and Yang Tong was created the Prince of Yue.

In spring 613, when Emperor Yang launched his second of three campaigns against Goguryeo, he left the eight-year-old Yang Tong nominally in charge of the eastern capital Luoyang, with the official Fan Zigai (樊子蓋) actually responsible. Subsequently, while Emperor Yang was in Goguryeo territory, the general Yang Xuangan rebelled near Luoyang, and Fan defended Luoyang under Yang Tong's command. The general Wei Wensheng (衛文昇), leading the army from the capital Chang'an under Yang You's command, came to Luoyang's aid, and Emperor Yang also abandoned the Goguryeo campaign and sent the generals Yuwen Shu and Lai Hu'er (來護兒) back to the Luoyang region; these Sui generals together defeated Yang Xuangan.

In 616, with most of Sui territory, particularly the northern commanderies, engulfed in agrarian rebellions, Emperor Yang went from Luoyang to Jiangdu (江都, in modern Yangzhou, Jiangsu), leaving Yang Tong in charge of Luoyang assisted by the officials Duan Da (段達), Yuan Wendu (元文都), Wei Jin (韋津), Huangfu Wuyi (皇甫無逸), and Lu Chu (盧楚). The rebel leaders Li Mi and Zhai Rang soon took advantage of Emperor Yang's departure (along with the elite Xiaoguo Army (驍果)), to capture the food storages Luokou Storage (洛口倉) and Huiluo Storage (回洛倉), near Luoyang, causing Luoyang to be down on food supplies. In spring 617, Yang Tong sent the generals Liu Changgong (劉長恭) and Pei Renji (裴仁基) against Li Mi and Zhai, but Liu and Pei were defeated. In summer 617, with his forces repeatedly defeated by Li Mi's, Yang Tong sent the official Yuan Shanda (元善達) to Jiangdu to seek aid from Emperor Yang, but Emperor Yang, believing in the prime minister Yu Shiji's assessments that the situation was not as severe as Yuan Shanda was claiming, initially refused to send aid. Pei soon surrendered to Li Mi, making Luoyang's position even more precarious. Emperor Yang finally did order the generals Pang Yu (龐玉) and Huo Shiju (霍世舉) to lead the troops from the Chang'an region to aid Luoyang, and Pang and Huo were able to force Li Mi away from Huiluo, allowing Luoyang to regain some of its food supply, although by fall 617 Li Mi had recaptured Huiluo.

In fall 617, Emperor Yang sent the general Wang Shichong (from Jiangdu) and several generals in other outlying areas to lead their troops to aid Luoyang. Wang was able to stem Li Mi's advances, and the armies stalemated. Meanwhile, the general Li Yuan had rebelled at Taiyuan and soon captured Chang'an, declaring Yang Tong's brother Yang You emperor (as Emperor Gong). In spring 618, Li Yuan sent his sons Li Jiancheng and Li Shimin to lead an army to Luoyang, ostensibly to aid it, but Yang Tong and his officials chose to have no communications at all with Li Jiancheng and Li Shimin. After Li Jiancheng and Li Shimin briefly engaged Li Mi, they considered the idea of attacking Luoyang but did not do so, and instead withdrew to Chang'an.

In late spring 618, Emperor Yang was killed in a coup led by the general Yuwen Huaji, who declared Emperor Yang's nephew Yang Hao the Prince of Qin emperor, and began to lead the Xiaoguo Army on a trek back north. Soon, news of Emperor Yang's death arrived at Chang'an and Luoyang. Li Yuan, in response, had Yang You yield the throne to him, establishing Tang dynasty as its Emperor Gaozu. The officials at Luoyang declared Yang Tong emperor, and those commanderies still loyal to Sui recognized him as emperor as well.

== Reign ==
When describing Yang Tong's brief reign, the official histories indicated that Yang Tong had a handsome face, and was meek, loving, and solemn in his personality.

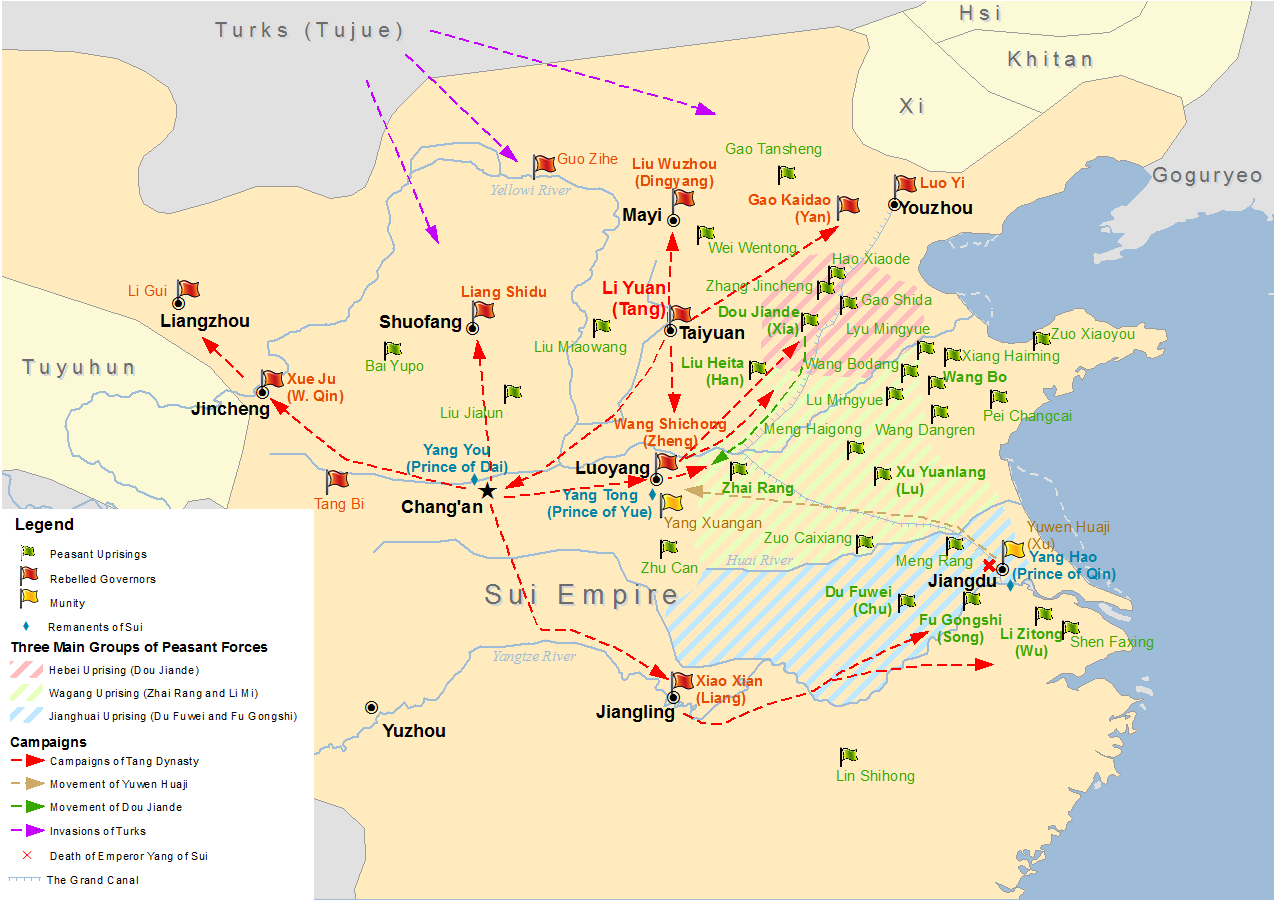
Map showing major uprisings and rebellions in the last years of Sui dynasty. Yang Tong's reign was based on the city of Luoyang.

Yang Tong posthumously honored his father Yang Zhao as an emperor, and honored his mother Consort Liu as empress dowager. The government was led by a collective leadership of seven officials—Duan Da (whom Yang Tong created the Duke of Chen), Wang Shichong (Duke of Zheng), Yuan Wendu (Duke of Lu), Huangfu Wuyi (Duke of Qi), Lu Chu, Guo Wenyi (郭文懿), and Zhao Changwen (趙長文). They became known as the "seven nobles."

Meanwhile, the officials at Luoyang, fearful that Yuwen Huaji was approaching Luoyang, contemplated their options. Yuan and Lu, under suggestion from Gai Cong (蓋琮), decided to try to make peace with Li Mi by bestowing him official Sui honors—including creating him the Duke of Wei, a title that Li Mi himself had claimed. Li Mi, who was apprehensive of Yuwen's advances himself, accepted. For the next month, Li Mi and Yuwen battled, and each time Li Mi was victorious over Yuwen, he would report to Yang Tong. The officials at Luoyang were pleased, except for Wang, who remarked that Yuan and Lu were awarding honors on a bandit, drawing suspicions from Yuan and Lu that Wang was intending to surrender the city to Yuwen. The "seven nobles" thereafter became to suspect each other.

Wang began to incite his troops by telling them that they would soon fall into Li Mi's trap, and that if Li Mi received the command over them (as Li Mi was nominally bestowed the office of supreme commander of the armed forces), he would surely slaughter them for having resisted him. When Yuan received news that Wang was doing this, he planned to ambush Wang. However, Duan revealed the plot to Wang, and Wang started a coup himself first, killing Lu and surrounding the palace. Huangfu fled to Chang'an (controlled by the Tang). At Wang's insistence, Yang Tong surrendered Yuan, who remarked to Yang Tong, "If I die in the morning, Your Imperial Majesty will die in the evening." Yang Tong wept, but still sent Yuan to Wang, who executed Yuan. Wang then met Yang Tong and pledged his loyalty, swearing that all he intended was to save himself and save the empire. Yang Tong took Wang inside the palace to meet Empress Dowager Liu, and Wang swore before her as well. Nevertheless, from this point, all power was in Wang's hands, and Yang Tong himself was powerless.

Upon hearing of Yuan and Lu's deaths, Li Mi broke off the peaceful relations with Yang Tong's regime, now under Wang's control. However, he had a low opinion of Wang, so he did not take much precaution against an attack from Wang. In fall 618, Wang made an all-out attack against Li Mi, dealing Li Mi a crushing defeat at the Battle of Yanshi. Li briefly considered fleeing to his general Xu Shiji, but ultimately decided to head west to Chang'an, to surrender to Tang. Most of Li Mi's former territory (modern central and eastern Henan) surrendered to Wang, and around the same time, the rebel generals Du Fuwei (who controlled modern central and southern Anhui), Shen Faxing (who controlled modern Zhejiang), Zhu Can (whose army roamed in southern Henan), and Dou Jiande (who controlled modern Hebei), all nominally submitted to Yang Tong, and at least in appearance, it appeared that Sui power was becoming restored under Yang Tong.

Meanwhile, Wang was becoming arrogant in his relations with Yang Tong and Empress Dowager Wang. Once, after attending a feast in the palace, he became afflicted with food poisoning, and he became convinced that there was poison in his food, and from that point on refused to see Yang Tong any more. Yang Tong knew that Wang was intent on usurping the throne, but could not think of anything to do other than to try to receive divine favor by donating palace silk to the poor—an action that Wang soon put a stop to by surrounding the palace. By spring 619, Wang had Yang Tong make him the Prince of Zheng and bestow on him the nine bestowments – the ultimate steps before taking the throne. In summer 619, Wang had Duan and Yun Dingxing (雲定興) enter the palace to try to persuade Yang Tong to yield the throne, but Yang Tong refused. Wang then sent a messenger to Yang Tong, promising that although he was taking the throne, he would return the throne to Yang Tong once Yang Tong grew older. He thereafter put Yang Tong under house arrest and issued an edict in Yang Tong's name, yielding the throne to himself, ending Sui. Wang took the throne as the emperor of a new state of Zheng.

== After reign ==
Wang Shichong made Yang Tong the Duke of Lu. A month later, Pei Renji and his son Pei Xingyan (裴行儼), as well as the officials Yuwen Rutong (宇文儒童), Yuwen Wen (宇文溫, Yuwen Rutong's brother), and Cui Deben (崔德本) plotted to kill Wang and restore Yang Tong. The news leaked, and the conspirators were slaughtered, along with their families.

Wang Shichong's brother Wang Shiyun (王世惲) the Prince of Qi persuaded Wang Shichong that in order to avoid a repeat of the plot, he needed to put Yang Tong to death. Wang Shichong agreed, and he sent his nephew Wang Renze (王仁則) the Prince of Tang and his servant Liang Bainian (梁百年) to force Yang Tong to drink poison. Yang Tong made one last plea, pointing out that Wang Shichong had previously promised to keep him alive. Liang considered requesting confirmation from Wang Shichong, but Wang Shiyun refused. Yang Tong set sacrifices to Buddha and prayed, "May it be that I will no longer again be reborn into an imperial household." He drank poison, but initially did not die. Wang Shiyun ordered that he be strangled. Wang Shichong posthumously honored Yang Tong as "Emperor Gong", the same posthumous name that Tang later gave Yang Tong's brother Yang You, but as Sui's official history, the Book of Sui was written during Tang, Yang You was recognized as Emperor Gong, while Yang Tong's status as a Sui emperor became ambiguous in traditional histories.

== Notes and references ==
- Book of Sui, vol. 59.
- History of Northern Dynasties, vol. 71.
- Zizhi Tongjian, vols. 180, 182, 183, 184, 185, 186, 187.

Regnal titles
Preceded by Emperor Yang of Sui	Emperor of Sui Dynasty (Eastern); 618–619	Succeeded by None (dynasty destroyed)
Preceded by Emperor Yang of Sui	Emperor of China (Southern Anhui); 618–619	Succeeded by Emperor Gaozu of Tang
Preceded by Emperor Yang of Sui	Emperor of China (Central Jiangsu); 618–619	Succeeded by Li Zitong (Emperor of Wu)
Preceded by Emperor Yang of Sui	Emperor of China (Western Henan/Northern Jiangsu/Northern Anhui); 618–619	Succeeded by Wang Shichong (Emperor of Zheng)
Preceded by Li Mi (Duke of Wei)	Emperor of China (Eastern Henan); 618–619	Succeeded by Wang Shichong (Emperor of Zheng)
