= Yang You =

Emperor of the Sui dynasty from 617 to 618

Emperor Gong of Sui 隋恭帝

Emperor of the Sui dynasty
- Reign: 18 December 617 – 12 June 618
- Predecessor: Emperor Yang of Sui
- Successor: Yang Tong
- Born: 605
- Died: 14 September 619 (aged 13–14)
- Burial: Zhuang Mausoleum (莊陵)
Names
- Family name: Yang (楊, Yáng); Given name: You (侑, Yòu)
Posthumous name
- Emperor Gōng (恭皇帝)
Temple name
- None
- House: Yang
- Dynasty: Sui
- Father: Yang Zhao, Crown Prince Yuande
- Mother: Crown Princess Wei

Yang You, also known by his posthumous name as the Emperor Gong of Sui (隋恭帝) (605 – 14 September 619?), was the last emperor of the Chinese Sui dynasty. He was installed as a puppet emperor by Li Yuan. After Li Yuan founded the Tang dynasty, he had Yang You executed.

Following Yang You's death, his brother Yang Tong claimed the Sui throne until 619.

Li Yuan had rebelled against the rule of You's grandfather Emperor Yang of Sui in 617 and captured the Sui capital Chang'an later that year, seizing Yang You and installing him as a puppet emperor. However, only the commanderies under Li Yuan's control recognized Yang You as emperor. The rest of the commanderies continued to recognize Emperor Yang of Sui as emperor. In 618, after news arrived that Emperor Yang had been killed by the general Yuwen Huaji, Li Yuan had the young emperor yield the throne to him. Li Yuan then murdered Yang You a year later.

== During Emperor Yang's reign ==
Yang You was born in 605, as a son of Yang Zhao, the son and crown prince of Emperor Yang. His mother was Yang Zhao's wife, Crown Princess Wei. He was probably the youngest of Yang Zhao's three sons—he was clearly younger than Yang Tan (楊倓), born in 603, and probably younger than Yang Tong, whose birth year is unknown, based the order in which they were eventually created imperial princes. However, under Confucian principles of succession, he would have been considered Yang Zhao's proper heir, as his mother was Yang Zhao's wife, while Yang Tan's and Yang Tong's mothers were concubines.

Yang Zhao died in 606. However, Emperor Yang did not make Yang You or either of his brothers crown prince to replace Yang Zhao, leaving matters ambiguous as to whether one of them, or Yang Zhao's younger brother Yang Jian the Prince of Qi, would inherit the throne eventually. He made the three sons of Yang Zhao imperial princes, and Yang You received the title of Prince of Dai. As Emperor Yang did not often stay in the capital Chang'an, starting 613, he made the eight-year-old Yang You nominally in charge of Chang'an, although he left the official Wei Wensheng (衛文昇) in actual charge of the city. Later that year, when the general Yang Xuangan rebelled and attacked the eastern capital Luoyang, it was Wei who led troops from Chang'an to aid Luoyang's defenses.

In 617, the general Li Yuan, fearful of Emperor Yang because Emperor Yang had become displeased with him over his inability to defend against Tujue attacks and suspicious of him after there had been prophecies that the next emperor would be named Li, rebelled at his headquarters at Taiyuan (太原, in modern Taiyuan, Shanxi). Li, wanting to both distance himself from Emperor Yang while declaring to the Sui forces that he was still loyal to Sui, claimed that his goal was to support Yang You as emperor and to persuade Yang Guang to return from Jiangdu (江都, in modern Yangzhou, Jiangsu) as Taishang Huang (retired emperor). Li proceeded quickly to Chang'an, and during Li's campaign, Wei died. Wei's lieutenants Yin Shishi (陰世師) and Gu Yi (骨儀) were left in charge of the city and guardianship over Yang You.

In winter 617, Li's forces breached Chang'an's defenses. Li took Yang You and declared him emperor (as Emperor Gong), remotely offering Emperor Yang the title of Taishang Huang, but only territory under Li's control recognized Yang You as emperor.

== Reign ==
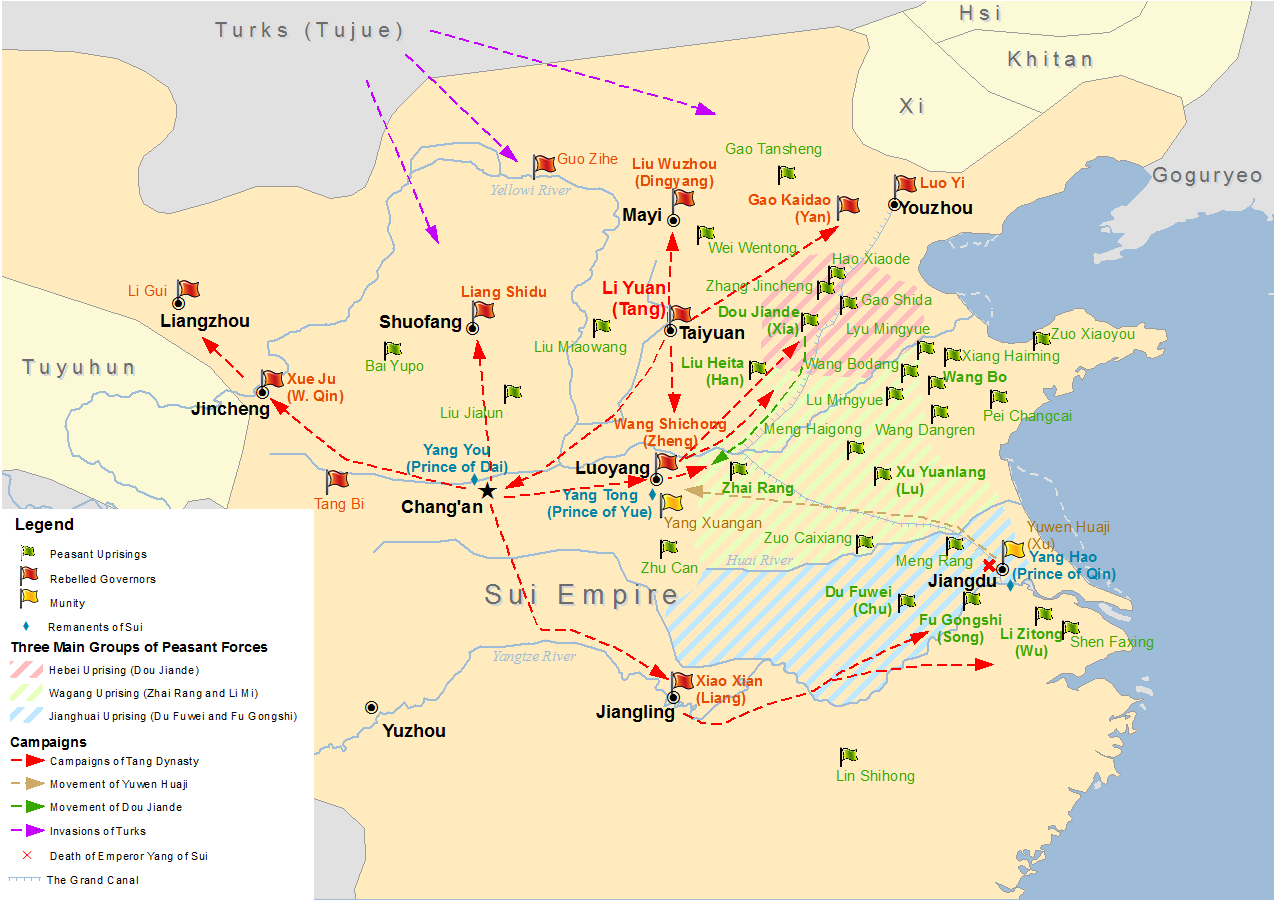
Map showing major uprisings and rebellions in the last years of Sui dynasty. Yang You's reign was based in Chang'an.

While Emperor Gong was emperor, the real power was in Li Yuan's hands, and Li had Yang You make him the Prince of Tang. Quickly, the surrounding commanderies, including most of modern Shaanxi, Sichuan, and Chongqing, submitted to Li.

With Luoyang under attack by the rebel leader Li Mi, in spring 618, Li sent troops commanded by his sons Li Jiancheng and Li Shimin there, claiming to be aiding the defense. The Sui forces at Luoyang refused to recognize Li's authority and made no contact with Li Jiancheng's and Li Shimin's forces, which withdrew after brief engagement with Li Mi's forces.

In summer 618, just six months after Yang took imperial title, Li had Yang pass the throne to him, establishing the Tang dynasty as Emperor Gaozu.

== After reign ==
Emperor Gaozu made the former emperor the Duke of Xi. Yang died in autumn 619, and while traditional histories did not directly state so, they implied that he was killed on the Tang emperor's orders. He had no sons, and his title was inherited by a distant nephew, Yang Xingji (楊行基).

== Notes ==
Chinese royalty
Preceded by Emperor Yang of Sui	Emperor of Sui Dynasty (Western); 617–618	Claim extinguished
Preceded by Emperor Yang of Sui	Emperor of China (Central/Southern Shaanxi/Sichuan/Chongqing/Central/Southern Shanxi; 617–618	Succeeded by Emperor Gaozu of Tang
