= Empress Dowager Liu (Sui dynasty) =

Empress dowager of the Sui dynasty

Empress Dowager Liu (劉太后, personal name unknown), briefly further honored as Empress Dowager Shenggan (聖感皇太后, literally "the empress dowager with holy emotions"), was an empress dowager of the Chinese Sui dynasty. She was a concubine of Yang Zhao, who was crown prince during the reign of his father Emperor Yang, and she was the mother of Yang Tong, the last person to claim the Sui throne.

Little is known about her background. During the time that Yang Zhao was crown prince, she carried the title of Liangdi (良娣), which appeared to be the highest of the ranks among a crown prince's concubines. She was younger than another Consort Liu, who bore Yang Zhao's oldest son Yang Tan (楊倓). It is not known when she bore Yang Tong, likely the second of his three sons. After Yang Zhao died in 606, her activities were not clear.

In 618, when the Sui state was already engulfed in various rebellions, Consort Liu was at the eastern capital Luoyang, where her son Yang Tong, then the Prince of Yue, had been left in charge of Luoyang while Emperor Yang was away at Jiangdu (modern Yangzhou, Jiangsu). In spring 618, Emperor Yang was killed in a coup led by the general Yuwen Huaji, and when news arrived at Luoyang, the officials at Luoyang declared Yang Tong emperor. Yang Tong posthumously honored Yang Zhao Emperor Xiaocheng, and honored Consort Liu as empress dowager.

Later in 618, the general Wang Shichong seized control of the government in a coup. In order to placate the young emperor, he entered the palace with him to pay homage to the empress dowager, and before her, he swore that he would be loyal to the young emperor. In order to flatter her, he asked to become her adoptive son, and also honored her with the title of Empress Dowager Shenggan. However, once he had firmer grasp on power, he stopped being as respectful to her and Yang Tong. In summer 619, he sent the officials Duan Da (段達) and Yun Dingxing (雲定興) to force Yang Tong to yield the throne to him. At that time, Yang Tong was in the presence of Empress Dowager Liu, and he shed tears before her, but eventually did yield the throne to Wang, who took the throne and established a new state of Zheng. As Wang created him the Duke of Lu, presumably she thereafter carried the title of Duchess Dowager of Lu.

Later that year, after the official Pei Renji (裴仁基; father of Pei Xingyan and Pei Xingjian) led a failed plot to overthrow Wang and restore Yang Tong, Wang sent his nephew Wang Renze (王仁則) and his servant Liang Bainian (梁百年) to force Yang Tong to commit suicide. Yang Tong asked for an opportunity to bid the former empress dowager farewell, but was not allowed to, and after he took poison but did not die from it, was strangled to death. There was no further record in history about what happened to her.
