= Empress Dowager Liu (Later Jin) =

Empress Dowager Liu (劉太后, personal name unknown) (died August 24, 942) was an empress dowager of the Chinese Five Dynasties and Ten Kingdoms Period state Later Jin.

Little is known about her background, including her birth date, place of origin, or ethnicity. She was a concubine of Shi Shaoyong (石紹雍), the father of Later Jin's founding emperor Shi Jingtang. She was not stated to be Shi Jingtang's mother, as Shi Jingtang's mother was described to be a Lady He, although it is possible that she was Shi Jingtang's birth mother and that Lady He was described to be his mother because Lady He was Shi Shaoyong's wife. After he became emperor, he honored her as consort dowager. Shortly before his death in 942, he honored her as empress dowager. After he died and was succeeded by his adoptive son (biological nephew, Shi Shaoyong's grandson) Shi Chonggui, she was honored as grand empress dowager. She died shortly after.
