= Yang Zhengdao =

Chinese figurehead of Eastern Turkic Khaganate

Yang Zhengdao (Chinese: 楊政道, c. 618 – early 650s) or Yang Min (Chinese: 楊愍) was a Chinese figurehead installed by the Eastern Turkic Khaganate during the bloody Sui–Tang transition. He was a grandson of Emperor Yang of Sui, and "ruled" as King of Sui (Chinese: 隋王) in an area around Dingxiang Commandery from 620 — when he was still an infant — to 630, the year he surrendered to the Tang Empire. His state is sometimes known in history as the Later Sui (Chinese: 後隋; pinyin: Hòu Suí).

His father Yang Jian and grandfather Emperor Yang were both killed in a coup before he was born.

== Background ==
Yang Zhengdao was a member of the House of Yang, the ruling family of the Sui dynasty. His father Yang Jian was the Prince of Qi during Emperor Yang of Sui's reign. In April 618, a mutiny led by Yuwen Huaji killed Emperor Yang, Yang Jian, and many members of the family while they were touring in Jiangdu. Empress Xiao (his paternal grandmother and Yang Jian's mother) and presumably Yang Zhengdao's pregnant mother were among those spared. Yuwen Huaji seized them and took them north, but was in turn captured by the rebel Dou Jiande in 619. Dou Jiande killed him in the name of the Sui and made the new-born Yang Zhengdao Duke of Xun.

At that time, the Eastern Turkic Khaganate's Shibi Khagan was married to Princess Yicheng, previously his stepmother and a member of the Yang family. At Princess Yicheng's request, Dou Jiande — who was eager to enter into an alliance with the Turks — delivered remnants of the Yang family, including the former Empress Xiao and Yang Zhengdao, north of the Great Wall where they were welcomed into Turkic territory. The Turks realized the usefulness of a puppet government which could rally Sui loyalists to their side; so in 620, Shibi's successor Chuluo Khagan established Yang Zhengdao as the King of Sui, including a "Branch Department of State Affairs", in Dingxiang Commandery.

== Life ==
Virtually nothing is known of his reign as a puppet, except that his subjects included many Sui refugees.

During the Tang campaign against the Eastern Turks of 629–630, Yang Zhengdao still held court in Dingxiang as a puppet of Illig Qaghan. The Tang army under Li Jing approached Dingxiang in December 629, and penetrated the Dingxiang wall with a night attack. Illig fled with his army, while a Sogdian advisor surrendered to the Tang with Yang Zhengdao and his grandmother Lady Xiao. They were brought back to Chang'an, arriving in February 630, where they lived out the rest of their lives. In the Zhenguan period (627–649), Yang Zhengdao worked as the Chief Steward of Clothing Service (尚衣奉御). He died early in the Yonghui period (650–655).

== Legacy ==
His son Yang Longli (楊隆禮), later known as Yang Chongli (楊崇禮), became a high-ranking politician.

Yang Chongli's sons Yang Shenyu (楊慎餘), Yang Shenjin (楊慎矜) and Yang Shenming (楊慎名) also held high positions under Emperor Xuanzong, schemed against other officials with Yang Guozhong and Li Linfu, but later in life crossed with them and were forced to death by Emperor Xuanzong.

Yang Shenjin's son Yang Jian (杨谏) held the position of governor of Yue Prefecture (岳州). Yang Shenyu's son Yang Yue (杨岳) held up to positions such as government superintendent (少府監).
