= Princess Yicheng =

Khatun of Eastern Turkic Khaganate
- Tenure: 599–630
- Predecessor: Princess Anyi (安义公主)
- Died: c. 27 March 630
- Khagan: Yami Qaghan; Shibi Qaghan; Chuluo Qaghan; Illig Qaghan
- House: Sui dynasty
- Father: Yang Xie (杨谐)

Princess Yicheng
- Traditional Chinese: 義成公主
- Simplified Chinese: 义成公主
Transcriptions
Standard Mandarin
- Hanyu Pinyin: Yìchéng Gōngzhǔ

Princess Yicheng was a Chinese princess of the Sui dynasty and a khatun of the Eastern Turkic Khaganate. She spent at least 30 years of her life among the Göktürks.

== Family ==
She was an extended family member of the Sui Dynasty. Her father was Yang Xie (杨谐) and her brother was Yang Shanjing (杨善经).

== Life as khatun ==
=== With Yami Qaghan ===
After the death of Princess Anyi (安义公主) in 599, she was made a princess by Emperor Wen of Sui and was wedded to Yami Qaghan under the heqin system.

=== With Shibi Qaghan ===
She was inherited by her step-son Shibi Qaghan in 609, in a levirate marriage. She had much influence on the Khagan, to the point of changing his orders. In the fall of 615, when Emperor Yang of Sui was visiting Yanmen Commandery on the northern frontier, the Khagan launched a surprise attack on the area, overrunning most of its Chinese settlements. Warned by Princess Yicheng, the Emperor, Empress, and their entourage escaped to the commandery seat at present-day Daixian. The Göktürks besieged them there on September 11. There were few resources in the seat, and the Emperor was reported to cry out of fear seeing this, Yuwen suggested that Emperor Yang should select a few thousand elite cavalry soldiers to attempt a break out, but Su Wei and Fan Zigai (樊子蓋) persuaded Emperor Yang not to attempt this. Emperor Yang put Xiao Yu and Pei Ju in charge of planning the military counteroffensive, but was only able to get the siege lifted after he followed the advice of the empress's brother Xiao Yu and sent messengers to Princess Yicheng, who was directing military affairs at the Turkic capital in her husband's absence. She falsely informed Shibi that the Göktürks were under attack from the north, and so he lifted the siege.

=== With Chuluo Qaghan ===
She was inherited by Chuluo Qaghan in 619, another step-son from her first marriage. Yicheng greeted Empress Xiao and Yang Zhengdao, a posthumous son of Yang Jian who was made a puppet King of Sui (隋國王) by Chuluo. This marriage was brief. After Chuluo's death in June, she refused to marry Ashina Momo (阿史那摸末, 607 – 649, was titled Yushe shad (郁射設) and eventually married to someone of imperial Li (李) clan), claiming he was weak.

=== With Illig Qaghan ===
After refusing Yushe Shad, she was finally wed to Illig Qaghan in 620, yet another step-son. She was killed in confusion when the Tang general Li Jing attacked the Khagan's encampment with Li Shiji in March 630, during the Battle of Yinshan.

== In popular media ==
- She was portrayed by Li Xia (李霞) in the 1993 Taiwanese costume drama Tang Taizong — Li Shimin (唐太宗李世民).
- Princess Yicheng is a character in Bakhtiyar Vahabzadeh's Göytürklar (Gokturks) play.
- In the Chinese drama The Long Ballad (长歌行), she is an antagonist.
