= Zheng Yuanshu =

Duke of Pei
- Tenure: 25 August 591 – 646
- Predecessor: Zheng Yi
- Successor: Zheng Hongjie
- Died: 646
- Issue: Zheng Hongjie
Posthumous name
- Chinese: 簡, romanized: Jiǎn
- House: Zheng clan of Xingyang
- Father: Zheng Yi
- Mother: Lady Xiao

Zheng Yuanshu (Chinese: 鄭元璹, romanized: Zhèng Yuánshú; died 646), courtesy name Defang (Chinese: 德芳), was a Chinese official and general who served under the Northern Zhou, Sui, and Tang dynasties. A native of Xingze County, Zhengzhou (present-day Xingyang, Henan), he belonged to the third branch of the northern lineage of Zheng clan of Xingyang. He is noted for repeated diplomatic missions to the Türks and for senior military and ceremonial posts in early Tang.

== Early life and family ==
Zheng Yuanshu was the son of Zheng Yi, governor of Qizhou and his wife Lady Xiao, granddaughter of Emperor Jianwen of Liang through his second son Xiao Daxin (523–551), Prince of Xunyang. By his father's merits he received the honorary rank yitong and was appointed as governor of Chenggao with 2,000 households. Gifted in letters and fond of the arts, Zheng entered military service young. Under the Sui he served as General of Agile Cavalry (驃騎將軍), later Commandant of the Martial Guard (武賁郎將), rising for military merit to Right Grand Master for Glorious Happiness (右光祿大夫) and Right Guard General (右候衛將軍). Late in the Daye era, appointed Grand Administrator of Wencheng Commandery.

On 12 October 617, Zhang Lun (張倫), an officer of Li Yuan, captured Longquan and Wencheng. Zheng was captured but released by Li Yuan, who appointed him Minister of Ceremonies (太常卿). After Li Yuan seized the capital, Zheng concurrently served as Banner-Participating General (參旗將軍) and was often sent to inspect forces and instruct them in military law.

In early 618, during the uprising of Xiao Xian at Jiangling, Li Yuan commissioned Zheng to lead a force via the Shangshan–Shangluo route, taking territories east of Nanyang.

In autumn 618 he and Li Chen (李琛), an extended Tang imperial family member, were sent to present singing girls to Shibi Qaghan of the Turks. On 17 November 618, when Zhu Can attacked Xizhou, Emperor Gaozu ordered Zheng to lead 10,000 infantry and cavalry; on 1 January 619 he defeated Zhu at Shangzhou.

== Missions to the Turks ==
Amid Turkic pressure on the Tang, Liu Wuzhou and his general Song Jingang (宋金剛) coordinated with Chuluo Qaghan against Fenzhou and Jinzhou. Gaozu dispatched Zheng to the Türks to argue for peace; Chuluo rejected the démarche and planned to attack Taiyuan. After Chuluo's death, Illig Qaghan detained Zheng for several years in the ordo until 622, suspecting him to order poisoning of Chuluo. The Türks subsequently detained two additional Tang envoys, at least one reportedly for refusing to perform full ceremonial prostration before the qaghan. In retaliation, Emperor Gaozu detained at least two Eastern Türk envoys; these were released in spring 622, when Gaozu also made a tribute payment to secure the return of the three Tang envoys including Zheng. Gaozu further consented to a marriage alliance, offering a Tang princess to Illig, though this pledge was not fulfilled. Gaozu compared Zheng's detention to that of Su Wu and Zhang Qian and appointed him Minister of the Court of State Ceremonial (鴻臚卿). Zheng then left office to observe mourning for his mother.

In September 622 Illig raided Bingzhou. In a court debate over war or peace, Zheng urged negotiation, while Feng Deyi advocated battle before peace; Gaozu adopted Feng's view but ordered the still-mourning Zheng to parley in the Turkic camp. Facing massed elite cavalry along the route from Jiexiu to Jinzhou, Zheng argued treaty breaches by the Türks and urged withdrawal in exchange for rewards and stable relations. Each side alleged the other's bad faith and cited specific instances. Tang sources state that Zheng prevailed in the exchange, leaving the Türk representatives unable to respond. The underlying events are uncertain, as Zheng's account to the Tang court may reflect self-promotion and exaggeration. In any case Illig accepted and withdrew. Prince Li Shimin commended Zheng in a letter.

In 627 he reported grave livestock losses and ominous portents within the Turkic army, predicting collapse within three years; Taizong concurred, and the Türks soon suffered defeat. In 629, as Governor-General of South Huizhou, Zheng induced Tangut submission, with chieftain Xifeng Bulai leading his tribe to surrender.

== Later life and death ==
Zheng later became Grand General of the Left Guard (左武候大將軍), was removed for an offence, then recalled as Prefect of Yizhou. In 644, when Taizong planned to attack Goguryeo, he consulted Zheng, who—recalling Sui campaigns—warned of distance, logistics, and the Easterners’ defensive strength; Taizong proceeded regardless. Zheng died in 646. He was posthumously named Prefect of Youzhou and given the posthumous name Jian (Chinese: 簡). Contemporary opinion faulted both Zheng and his father for alleged lack of filial piety toward elders, a charge once admonished by Emperor Wen of Sui sending Zheng Yi a copy of the Classic of Filial Piety.

One poem by Zheng survives, recorded in the Supplemental Compilation to the Complete Tang Poems, titled “Inscription for a drinking-party at the Curved Pond” (Chinese: 四言曲池酺飲座銘, romanized: Sìyán Qūchí Púyǐn Zuòmíng):

Original

離酺將促，遠就池台。
酒隨歡至，花逐風來。
鶴歸波動，魚躍萍開。
人生所盛，何過樂哉。

Translation

The parting feast draws near, I go afar to the pond and terrace.
Wine arrives with delight, flowers come borne on the wind.
Cranes return and stir the ripples, fish leap and the duckweed parts.
In all that life holds at its height, what surpasses joy?

== Sources ==
- New Book of Tang, volume 100, p. 3930
