= Liang Shidu =

Chinese agrarian leader and general (died 628)

Emperor of Liang
- Reign: 617 – 628
- Born: c. 571; Shuofang, Sui China
- Died: June 3, 628 (aged 56–57); Shuofang, Tang China
Names
- Family name: Liáng (梁); Given name: Shidu (師都)
Era name and dates
- Yonglong (永隆): 617 – 628
Regnal name
- Old Turkic: 𐱃𐰺𐰑𐰆 𐰋𐰃𐰠𐰏𐰀 𐰴𐰍𐰣, romanized: Tardu Bilgä Qaɣan; Chinese: 大度毗伽可汗, romanized: Dàdù Píjiā Kèhán

Liang Shidu (Chinese: 梁師都, romanized: Liáng Shīdōu, 517 – 3 June 628) was a claimant to title of Emperor of China who rebelled against the rule of the Chinese Sui dynasty near the end of the reign of Emperor Yang of Sui. Liang Shidu claiming the title of Emperor of Liang with the aid from Eastern Turkic Khaganate retained the modern northern Shaanxi and western Inner Mongolia region for over a decade, but was gradually weakened by attacks from the Tang dynasty, whose founding emperor Emperor Gaozu and successor Emperor Taizong had eliminated the rival contenders for power one by one, leaving Liang isolated. In 628, with the Eastern Turks in internal turmoil and unable to come to his aid, Emperor Taizong launched another attack on Liang. Liang's cousin Liang Luoren (梁洛仁) assassinated him and surrendered, completing Tang's drive to reunite China after Sui's collapse.

== Initial uprising ==
Liang Shidu was from a prominent clan of Xia Province (夏州, roughly modern Yulin, Shaanxi), and during the reign of Emperor Yang of Sui, he served as a military officer. In or shortly before 617, he quit the army and returned to his home commandery (as Xia Province had been converted into the Shuofang Commandery). At that time, there were many agrarian rebellions in the region, and Liang gathered a group of men to create a local protective force. He later ambushed the secretary general of Shuofang Commandery, Tang Shizong (唐世宗). He initially claimed the title of Grand Chancellor (Chinese: 大丞相, romanized: Dà Chéngxiàng) imitating Emperor Wen of Sui who also acted as a regent to a boy emperor before him.

He later entered into an alliance with Eastern Turkic Qaghanate. When the Sui general Zhang Shilong (張世隆) tried to attack him, he defeated Zhang. He thereafter captured several other nearby commanderies — Diaoyin (雕陰, in modern Yulin as well), Honghua (弘化, roughly modern Dingxi, Gansu), and Yan'an (延安, roughly modern Yan'an, Shaanxi). He submitted to Eastern Türks' Shibi Khan, who created him the Dadupiqie Qaghan (Chinese: 大度毗伽可汗, romanized: Dàdù Píjiā Kèhán, itself a transliteration of Old Turkic: 𐱃𐰺𐰑𐰆 𐰋𐰃𐰠𐰏𐰀 𐰴𐰍𐰣, romanized: Tardu Bilgä Qaɣan) and bestowed on him a flag with a wolf head, the symbol of the Türks. He guided Eastern Tujue forces to occupy the Ordos Desert region. Subsequently, Shibi Qaghan gave him a Chinese regnal name Jieshi Tianzi (Chinese: 解事天子, romanized: Jiěshì Tiānzǐ, lit. 'Understanding Tianzi') for Liang as a translation for his Turkic title, although he himself declared a state of Liang and himself its emperor with era name Yonglong.

== Early reign ==
Map of the situation in northern China during the transition from the Sui to the Tang, with the main contenders for the throne and the main military operations

Liang Shidu entered into an alliance with another rebel leader of the region, Guo Zihe (郭子和). In 618, with the Sui general Li Yuan having rebelled against Emperor Yang and entered the capital Chang'an, declaring Emperor Yang's grandson Yang You emperor (as Emperor Gong), another rebel ruler, Xue Ju the Emperor of Qin, entered into an alliance with Liang and Eastern Türks, seeking to attack Chang'an. However, Li Yuan was able to persuade the Eastern Türk general Ashina Duobi (Shibi Qaghan's brother) to give up the campaign. In fall 618, with Li Yuan having had Yang You yield the throne to him, establishing the Tang dynasty as its Emperor Gaozu, Liang tried to attack Ling Prefecture (靈州, roughly modern Yinchuan, Ningxia), which had submitted to Tang, but was repelled.

In spring 619, Shibi Qaghan was planning on a major incursion into Chinese territory, and both Liang and another rebel ruler, Liu Wuzhou, joined him. However, Shibi Qaghan died and his brother Ashina Xichun succeeded him, who terminated the campaign after receiving a large tribute from Tang. Liang then again attacked Ling Prefecture but was again repelled. In fall 619, he attacked Yan Prefecture (延州, i.e., the former Yan'an Commandery), which had submitted to Tang as well, but was repelled by the Tang general Duan Decao (段德操). Another Liang attack in fall 620, in conjunction with Eastern Türks, was also repelled by Duan. Meanwhile, Liang's one-time ally Guo Zihe, who had submitted to Tang as well, had turned against Liang and Eastern Türks, seizing Liang's city of Ningshuo (寧朔, in modern Yulin). Eastern Türks, in response, imprisoned Guo's brother Guo Zisheng (郭子升), and Guo subsequently moved south to avoid Eastern Türk forces.

Meanwhile, with his generals Zhang Ju (張舉) and Liu Min (劉旻) having defected to Tang and with Liu Wuzhou having been defeated by Tang earlier in 620, Liang was fearful that he would become next, and he sent his official Lu Jilan (陸季覽) to point out to Chuluo Qaghan that he should act against Tang before it became too strong to control. Qaghan agreed, and made a grand plan to attack Tang on several sides, incorporating Xi tribe forces and those of another rebel ruler, Dou Jiande the Prince of Xia, into the plan. According to this plan, Baghatur Shad would enter Wuyuan, Nipu Shad and Shidu would proceed to Yanzhou, while Chuluo Qaghan himself would attack Taiyuan, have Ashina Shibobi join with the Xi, Kumo Xi, Khitan, and Mohe on the Youzhou road, and have Dou Jiande join at Jinzhou and Jiangzhou from Fukou. However, before Qaghan could launch his plan, he died. He was succeeded by Ashina Duobi as Illig Qaghan who arrested the Tang Minister of Ceremonies (Chinese: 太常卿; pinyin: tàichángqīng) Zheng Yuanshu on suspicion of poisoning the qaghan.

In spring 622, Duan launched an attack on Liang, capturing the eastern city of Liang's capital Shuofang, forcing Liang to withdraw to the western city. However, relief forces from Eastern Türks arrived, and Duan withdrew. Liang subsequently sent his brother Liang Luo'er (梁洛兒) with Eastern Türk forces, to attack Tang's Ling Prefecture, but was repelled by the Tang general Li Daozong.

== Late reign ==
He was the last Chinese rebel to stand against Tang. In spring 623, Liang Shidu's generals He Sui (賀遂) and Suo Tong (索同) defected to Tang, along with the territory they controlled. In summer 623, Duan Decao launched another attack on Liang, reaching Shuofang, but withdrew after pillaging. In response, the Liang general Xin Liao'er (辛獠兒) guided Eastern Türk troops to attack Tang's Lin Prefecture (林州, roughly modern Qingyang), and then Liang himself guided Eastern Türk forces to attack Tang's Kuang Prefecture (匡州, also in modern Yulin). Around this time, the Qihu chieftain Liu Yaocheng came to submit to the Liang state, but Liang Shidu instead turned on him and annexed all his forces, causing his own officers to become fearful and distrustful of him. In fall 624, the major Liang official Bai Fuyuan (白伏願) defected to Tang.

In 626, Emperor Gaozu's son Li Shimin the Prince of Qin, ambushed and killed his brothers Li Jiancheng the Crown Prince and Li Yuanji the Prince of Qi, and then effectively forced Emperor Gaozu to yield the throne to him (as Emperor Taizong). Meanwhile, Liang himself saw his forces weakening, and suggested to Illig Qaghan that he invade Tang. Illig and his nephew, the subordinate Ashina Shibobi jointly attacked the Tang capital Chang'an, but withdrew after Emperor Taizong personally met them and offered additional tributes.

== Death ==
In 628, Emperor Taizong of Tang, seeing that internal Turkic turmoil prevented them from aiding Liang Shidu, wrote a letter urging him to surrender, but Liang Shidu firmly refused. The emperor then ordered Liu Min, the Military Administrator and Chief Clerk of Xiazhou, and Liu Lancheng, the Marshal, to prepare for an attack. He also employed a stratagem to bribe and recruit Liang's civil and military officials. Liang Shidu's general Li Zhengbao once planned to capture Liang Shidu and surrender to Tang, but when Liang Shidu discovered this, Li fled and surrendered to Tang instead. Taizong sent raiding forces to pillage Liang periodically, as well as to burn the crops, reducing Liang's food supplies, and also sent agents into Liang territory to damage the relationships between Liang and his officials. In summer 628, when a number of Khitan tribes surrendered to Tang, Illig Qaghan offered to trade Liang for the Khitan tribes, but Emperor Taizong refused.

That same year, Emperor Taizong deemed the time ripe and ordered his brother-in-law Chai Shao (柴紹) and Palace Attendant Supervisor Xue Wanjun (薛萬均) to lead a major military campaign against Liang Shidu, while also dispatching Liu Min to press toward the eastern city of Shuofang. Liang Shidu sent troops to meet the attack but was defeated by the Tang general Liu Lancheng, and Turkic reinforcements were also crushed by Chai Shao. Later the food supplies ran out, Liang Shidu's cousin Liang Luoren assassinated Liang Shidu and surrendered the city to Tang. Exact death date of Shidu is conflated in sources. Emperor Taizong's biography in Old Book of Tang indicate that Liang was killed on the bingshen day of the 4th month of the 2nd year of the Zhenguan era of Emperor Taizong's reign; this corresponds to 28 May 628 in the Julian calendar. Taizong's biography in New Book of Tang and Zizhi Tongjian both dated Liang's death to the rényín day of that month, which corresponds to 3 June 628 in the Julian calendar.

Liang Luoren's action was considered an immense service to the Tang Dynasty, as it secured the final regional rival without a prolonged siege. The Tang court rewarded him generously. He was given the military position of General of the Right Fearless Guards (Chinese: 右驍衛將軍, romanized: Yòu Xiāowèi Jiāngjūn) and was granted the title Duke of Shuofang County (Chinese: 朔方郡公, romanized: Shuòfāng Jùngōng), a noble title named after the very city he surrendered.

== Sources ==
- Wang, Zhenping (2013). Tang China in multi-polar Asia: a history of diplomacy and war. The world of East Asia. Honolulu: University of Hawaii Press. ISBN 978-0-8248-3788-4.
- Old Book of Tang, Volume 56, Biography 6, "Biography of Liang Shidu"
- New Book of Tang, Volume 87, Biography 12, "Biography of Liang Shidu"

Regnal titles
| Preceded by Emperor Yang of Sui | Emperor of China (Northern Shaanxi/Western Inner Mongolia); 617–628 | Succeeded by Emperor Taizong of Tang |
