= Empress of the Sui dynasty =

Empress of the Sui dynasty may refer to:

- Empress Dugu (r. 581–602), the wife of Emperor Wen
- Empress Xiao (Sui dynasty) (r. 605–618), the wife of Emperor Yang
