= Yang Jian (Sui prince) =

Chinese prince (585–618)

- Prince of Qi
- Born: 585
- Died: 618 (aged 32–33)
- Issue: Yang Zhengdao
- Father: Emperor Yang of Sui
- Mother: Empress Xiao

Yang Jian (Chinese: 楊暕; 585 – 11 April 618), courtesy name Shiku (世胐), nickname Ahai (阿孩), was an imperial prince of the Chinese Sui dynasty. During the reign of his father Emperor Yang, he carried the title of Prince of Qi. When his father was killed in a coup led by the general Yuwen Huaji in April 618, Yang Jian and his two sons were also killed.

== During Emperor Wen's reign ==
Yang Jian was born in 585, during the reign of his grandfather Emperor Wen. He was the second son of Emperor Wen's son Yang Guang the Prince of Jin and Yang Guang's wife Princess Xiao. Yang Jian was considered handsome in his childhood, and Emperor Wen loved him. In 593, Emperor Wen created him the Prince of Yuzhang. As he grew in age, he studied the Confucian classics and histories. In 599, Emperor Wen made him the head of the legislative bureau (Neishi Sheng, 內史省), one of the five main bureaus of government.

In 600, due to Yang Guang's machinations, Emperor Wen deposed Yang Jian's uncle Yang Yong the Crown Prince, and created Yang Guang crown prince instead. In 601, Yang Jian was made the commandant at Yang Province (揚州, roughly modern Yangzhou, Jiangsu), to replace his father Yang Guang.

== During Emperor Yang's reign ==
=== 604–618 ===
In 604, Emperor Wen died—a death that traditional historians, while admitting a lack of direct evidence, generally believed to be a murder ordered by Yang Guang. Yang Guang took the throne as Emperor Yang. In 606, Emperor Yang created Yang Jian the greater title of Prince of Qi. Soon thereafter, Yang Jian's older brother Yang Zhao the Crown Prince died, and while under traditional Confucian principles of succession, one of Yang Zhao's sons should be created crown prince, but Emperor Yang did not do so, creating Yang Zhao's sons only imperial princes, and it was commonly believed that Yang Jian would become crown prince. As a result, Yang Jian became particularly honored by others, and when Emperor Yang sought people to serve on Yang Jian's staff, young nobles were anxious to be included, and Yang Zhao's guards were transferred to Yang Jian. He was made the mayor of the eastern capital Luoyang as well.

As a result, Yang Jian became arrogant, and he and his staff member often carried out illegal deeds, and he particularly liked to seize commoner women to make them his concubines. In one instance, his aunt Yang Lihua the Princess Leping initially offered a beautiful woman from the Liu (柳) clan to Emperor Yang, but Emperor Yang did not act quickly, and the princess offered Lady Liu to Yang Jian instead. When Emperor Yang subsequently wanted Lady Liu, he found out that Yang Jian already took her, a fact that irritated him. The relationship between father and son further deteriorated when, on a visit to Yulin, they hunted together—as Emperor Yang's guards were able to kill few animals, they blamed Yang Jian's guards for taking all of the animals, which made Emperor Yang further irritated at Yang Jian. Emperor Yang began to investigate Yang Jian's faults.

Soon, one incident gave Emperor Yang the excuse to investigate further—as one of Yang Jian's favorite officials, Huangfu Xu (皇甫詡) the county magistrate of Yijue County (伊闕, a suburb of Luoyang), was taken by Yang Jian to Fenyang Palace (汾陽宮, in modern Linfen, Shanxi) in contravention of regulations that county magistrates were not allowed to leave their counties without good cause. The official Wei Deyu (韋德裕), in order to please Emperor Yang, filed an indictment against Yang Jian. Emperor Yang sent his guards to Yang Jian's palace and searched it, seeking evidence of further wrongdoing, and they found a major scandal. Yang Jian's wife Princess Wei (韦妃) had died sometime ago, and Yang Jian then carried out an affair with her sister Lady Wei (韦氏) who had already married a man from the Yuan (元) clan. Believing in a fortuneteller who told him that Lady Wei would one day be empress and believing Yang Zhao's three sons to be in the way, Yang Jian engaged witches to curse his nephews. In anger, Emperor Yang executed some of Yang Jian's close associates and ordered Lady Wei to commit suicide. Emperor Yang commented, "I only have Yang Jian as a son; otherwise, I would have dragged him to the execution field and had him beheaded, to show the power of laws."

Yang Jian was not removed from his post, but thereafter exerted little influence. Emperor Yang sent a guard commander to watch over Yang Jian, with orders to report any wrongdoing immediately. He also gave Yang Jian a small number of guards, and those who were assigned to Yang Jian were all weak or old. There were few references to Yang Jian in history for the rest of Emperor Yang's reign. One such reference was in spring 610, when a number of people claiming to be incarnations of the Maitreya Buddha entered Luoyang and seized weapons, intending to attack the palace, but before they could do so, Yang Jian encountered them. Yang Jian seized them and executed all of them.

=== 618 and the coup's aftermath ===
In 618, with most of Sui territory engulfed in agrarian rebellions, Emperor Yang was at Jiangdu (江都, the capital of Yang Province), and Yang Jian was with him. A coup led by the general Yuwen Huaji killed Emperor Yang, with Emperor Yang initially stating to Empress Xiao, "Does not Ahai do this?" The troops involved in the coup then went to arrest Yang Jian. Yang Jian, believing the troops to be sent by Emperor Yang, pleaded, "Honorable imperial messenger, please do not carry out the edict yet. I will surely not rebel against the state." The troops did not respond, and they dragged Yang Jian and his two sons out to the streets and beheaded them. Until his death Yang Jian was unaware it was out of whose intention.

One of Yang Jian's concubines was pregnant at the time of his death. Later, she accompanied Yang Jian's mother Empress Xiao to Tujue to join Princess Yicheng (義成公主), a Sui princess who had married Göktürk Shibi Khan Ashina Duojishi. Yang Jian's concubine had earlier given birth to a posthumous son, Yang Zhengdao, and Yang Zhengdao was created the King of Sui (隋國王) (Note: Guówáng (Chinese: 國王; lit. 'King of a Country/State') is a term of the monarch of a kingdom in Chinese (see Zhou dynasty), but in this case, the Göktürk Khaganate probably referred to Yang Zhengdao more as a client king than as the Chinese monarch, which was then competed between Sui princes Yang Hao, Yang Tong and other claimants.) by Ashina Duojishi's brother and successor the Chuluo Khan Ashina Qilifu. Yang Zhengdao later returned to China during the reign of Emperor Taizong of Tang and was made Yuanwai sanqi shilang (员外散骑侍郎).

Yang Jian's male descendants through his only surviving son, Yang Shenjin and his two brothers, later were forced to commit suicide in 747 by Emperor Xuanzong due to their conspiracy with Yang Guozhong against the other Tang officials, ending the male-line of Sui imperial house of Yang.

== Relatives ==
=== Immediate family ===
- Wife and lovers:
  - Princess consort Wei (韦妃), daughter of Wei Chong (韦冲), the Minister of People's Affairs (民部尚书) (Note: Sui dynasty version of the office Minister of Revenue (戶部尚書).)
  - Lady Wei (韦氏), sister of Princess consort Wei, wife of a man from Yuan (元) clan
- Children:
  - Two sons died in 618
  - Yang Zhengdao (618/619–650s), Yuanwai sanqi shilang (员外散骑侍郎)
  - One daughter with Lady Wei

=== Descendants ===
- Yang Jian
  - Two sons died in 618
  - Yang Zhengdao
    - Yang Chongli (杨崇礼), given the office of Minister of Palace Supplies (太府卿), Minister of Revenue (户部尚书)
      - Yang Shenming (杨慎名), died 747
      - Yang Shenjin (杨慎矜), died 747
      - Yang Shenyu (杨慎馀), died 747
      - One daughter, married a man with surname Xin (辛)
        - Xin Jingcou (辛景凑)
  - One daughter with Lady Wei (韦氏)
