= Ashina Xichun =

Chuluo Qaghan

Qaghan of the Eastern Turkic Khaganate
- Reign: 619 – c. December 620
- Predecessor: Shibi Qaghan
- Successor: Illig Qaghan
- Died: c. December 620; Ordu-Baliq, Eastern Turkic Khaganate
- Spouse: Princess Yicheng
- Issue: Ashina Momo (阿史那摸末); Ashina She'er
Names
- Ashina Xichun (阿史那奚純)
Regnal name
- Chuluo Qaghan (處羅可汗 or 處邏可汗 or 叱羅可汗)
- House: Ashina
- Dynasty: Eastern Turkic Khaganate
- Father: Yami Qaghan
- Religion: Tengrism

Ashina Xichun (Chinese: 阿史那奚純), regnal name Chuluo Qaghan (Chinese: 處羅可汗; Middle Chinese: (Guangyun) [tɕʰi̯o˥lɑ˩ kʰɑ˥ɣɑn˩˥]; Turkic: Çula Han), was a qaghan of the Eastern Turkic Khaganate. He was the second son of Yami Qaghan and succeeded his elder brother Shibi Qaghan to the throne, ruling for 18 months. Prior to becoming qaghan, he was also known by his title as Ilteber Shad (俟利弗設) or Il Shad (乙力設).

== Reign ==
Ashina Xichun succeeded his brother Shibi Qaghan as khagan of the Eastern Turkic Khaganate in 619, as Shibi's son Ashina Shibobi was still a minor. He made Shibobi Nipu shad and appointed eastern territories to him. He terminated the campaign started by his brother after receiving a large tribute from the Tang.

Nevertheless, he created Yang Zhengdao, a posthumous son of Yang Jian, as a puppet king of Sui (隋國王). Starting to plan a major assault as advised by Liang Shidu, he became allied to Wang Shichong and Dou Jiande. As part of the plan, he requested Dou to cross the Taihang Mountains and meet him at Jin (晉州, roughly modern Linfen, Shanxi) and Jiang (絳州, roughly modern Yuncheng, Shanxi) Prefectures.

However he died from illness, possibly poisoned by the Minister of Ceremonies (Chinese: 太常卿; pinyin: tàichángqīng) Zheng Yuanshu (鄭元璹). The perpetrators were executed by Illig Qaghan.

== Family ==
He married the Sui dynasty's Princess Yicheng (義成公主) in heqin, the former wife of Yami Qaghan in a levirate marriage along with other wives. Issue:

- Ashina Momo (阿史那摸末, 607–649) - was titled Yushe shad (郁射設) and married to someone of the imperial Li (李) clan.
  - Ashina Wushi (阿史那勿施, d.683)
    - Ashina Zinu (阿史那自奴, 654 – 21 November 722)
      - Ashina Dachen (阿史那大臣)
      - Ashina Yanchen (阿史那彦臣)
      - Ashina Dichen (阿史那帝臣)
      - Ashina Mingchen (阿史那名臣)
      - Ashina Jianchen (阿史那諫臣)
- Ashina She'er (阿史那社爾, 609–655) - was titled To shad in youth and married to Princess Hengyang (衡陽公主), daughter of Gaozu.
  - Ashina Buzhen (阿史那步真)
  - Ashina Daozhen (阿史那道真) - a general in Tang army.

== Sources ==
- Zongzheng, Xue (1992). "A History of Turks". Beijing: Chinese Social Sciences Press. ISBN 7-5004-0432-8. p. 208-213.

Ashina Xichun Ashina Clan
Preceded by Shibi Qaghan	Khagan of the Eastern Turkic Khaganate; 619–621	Succeeded by Illig Qaghan
