= Empress Xiao (Sui dynasty) =

Empress of China from 605 to 618

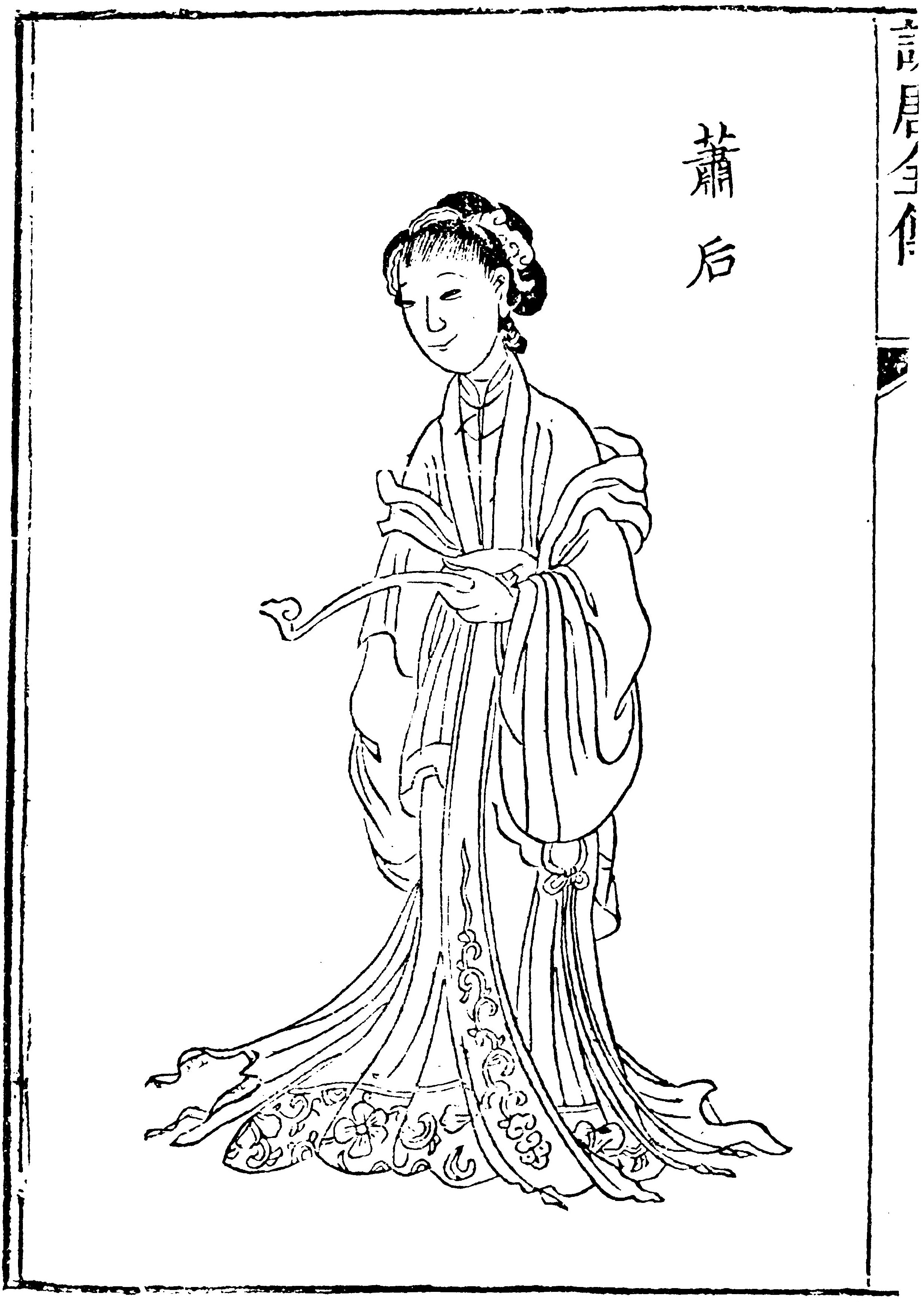

Empress consort of the Sui dynasty
- Tenure: 605 – 11 April 618
- Born: 566; Jiangling, Western Liang dynasty
- Died: 17 April 648 (aged 82); Chang'an, Tang dynasty
- Burial: Jiangdu
- Spouse: Emperor Yang of Sui
- Issue: Yang Zhao, Crown Prince Yuande; Yang Jian, Prince of Qi; Princess Nanyang; Third Son; Princess Yang
Posthumous name
- Empress Min (愍皇后; "the suffering empress")
- House: Xiao (by birth); Yang (by marriage)
- Father: Emperor Ming of Western Liang
- Mother: Lady Zhang

Empress Xiao (Chinese: 蕭皇后; c. March 566 – 17 April 648), personal name unknown, posthumous name Empress Min, was an empress consort of Emperor Yang of the Chinese Sui dynasty.

== Background ==
The future Empress Xiao was born into the imperial house of the Western Liang dynasty – as a daughter of Xiao Kui, Emperor Ming of Western Liang, who claimed the Liang throne as a vassal of Northern Zhou and then Sui. She was born in the second month of the Chinese calendar, and at that time, the superstitious Emperor Ming believed birth in that month to be an indicator of ill fortune. She was therefore given to her uncle Xiao Ji (蕭岌) the Prince of Dongping to be raised, but Xiao Ji and his wife both soon died. She was instead raised by her maternal uncle Zhang Ke (張軻). As Zhang was poor, she had to participate in labor, and she willingly did so. In 582, Emperor Wen of Sui, because Emperor Ming had supported him during Northern Zhou's civil war in 580 against the general Yuchi Jiong, wanted to take one of Emperor Ming's daughters to be the wife of his son Yang Guang, the Prince of Jin. Emperor Ming had fortunetellers discern whether any of his daughters was suitable, but the fortunetellers ruled that none was suitable. Emperor Ming then welcomed her back from Zhang's house, and the fortunetellers found her to be suitable, and so she was given to Yang Guang in marriage. She thereafter carried the title of Princess of Jin.

== As princess and crown princess ==
Princess Xiao was said to be meek and intelligent, and she was talented both in reading text and in fortunetelling. Emperor Wen was pleased with her, and Yang Guang favored and respected her. Further, in order to please his mother Empress Dugu, who disfavored men who had concubines, Yang Guang, while having some concubines, pretended to have none beside Princess Xiao, and as part of his elaborate attempt to appear both filially pious and frugal, when Empress Dugu's servant girls arrived at Yang Guang's defense post at Yang Province (揚州, roughly modern Yangzhou, Jiangsu) to deliver messages to and from Empress Dugu, Yang Guang would have the servant girls stay with Princess Xiao despite their inferior status. Eventually, Emperor Wen deposed Yang Guang's older brother Yang Yong (whose faults, in his parents' eyes, were wastefulness (which displeased Emperor Wen) and having many concubines (which displeased Empress Dugu)) from his position as crown prince in 600 and created Yang Guang crown prince to replace him. Thereafter, Princess Xiao carried the title of crown princess. She and Yang Guang had two sons together – Yang Zhao and Yang Shiku; it is likely that Yang Guang's only known daughter, the later Princess Nanyang, was also her daughter. (Yang Guang's third and final son, Yang Gao, was born of a Consort Xiao, who might have been a sister of hers.)

== As empress consort ==
Emperor Wen died in 604—a death that traditional historians generally believe was a murder ordered by Yang Guang, although they admit a lack of direct evidence—and Yang Guang took the throne as Emperor Yang. In 605, he created Crown Princess Xiao empress. He soon turned away from the virtuous living style he engaged in to please his parents, and he lived luxuriously, with tens of thousands of women filling his palaces. He still maintained respect for Empress Xiao, and he made many of her relatives, including her older brother Xiao Cong the Duke of Liang (Western Liang's final emperor), officials in his government. However, Yang Zhao, who became crown prince, died in 606, and Yang Shiku lost Emperor Yang's favor in 608 over his use of witchcraft against Yang Zhao's sons. Empress Xiao often accompanied Emperor Yang on his tours around the empire, and she saw that he had lost his virtues. She wrote a circumspect poem to try to get Emperor Yang to change his ways, but he either did not realize that was her intent, or simply ignored the poem.

In 607, when Emperor Yang visited the submissive Qimin Khan of the Eastern Turkish Khaganate (Tujue), Empress Xiao accompanied him and she personally visited the tent of the khan's wife Princess Yicheng, who was a daughter of a Yang clansman. In 615, when Emperor Yang and Empress Xiao were touring the northern frontier, Qimin Khan's son and successor Shibi Khan launched a surprise attack against Yanmen Commandery in reprisal against various offenses by the emperor. Princess Yicheng sent the imperial couple advanced warning of her new husband's plans, and they were able to reach the well-fortified commandery seat at present-day Daixian in Shanxi. When Shibi Khan besieged them there on 11 September, Empress Xiao's younger brother Xiao Yu suggested seeking further assistance from Princess Yicheng, who—pursuant to Turkish custom—was entrusted with overseeing military affairs at home in her husband's absence. She sent the khan a false report of a northern attack on the khaganate; between this and reports of numerous Chinese reinforcements rushing to answer the emperor's call for help and extravagant promises of reward and promotion, the khan decided to lift the siege and return north. (Subsequently, though, rather than listening to Xiao Yu's advice to end his campaigns against Goguryeo, Emperor Yang expelled the minister from his court.)

By 618, with virtually entire empire engulfed in warfare from the rebellions against her husband's rule, Empress Xiao was with her husband at Jiangdu (江都), the capital of Yang Province. They were protected (as he believed) by the elite Xiaoguo Army (驍果). However, by this point, even the Xiaoguo soldiers were plotting rebellion, as they missed their families in the north. When a lady in waiting reported the plot to Empress Xiao, she told the lady in waiting, "I will let you report it to the emperor." Emperor Yang, not willing to hear any bad news, however, instead executed the lady in waiting. Later, when other ladies in waiting wanted to report on the plot, Empress Xiao advised them against it, reasoning that there was nothing left that could save the dynasty. Soon, a plot led by the general Yuwen Huaji came to fruition, and Emperor Yang, along with his sons Yang Shiku and Yang Gao and grandson Yang Tan the Prince of Yan were killed. Empress Xiao and her ladies in waiting wrapped him in a mat and made caskets for both Emperor Yang and Yang Gao.

== After Emperor Yang's death ==
Yuwen Huaji declared Emperor Yang's nephew Yang Hao the Prince of Qin emperor, then abandoned Jiangdu and headed back north, taking Empress Xiao and her ladies in waiting north. He was not a good commander or governor, however, and his campaign north suffered constant defections and defeats. By fall 618, he was in a desperate situation, and deciding to become emperor before final defeat, he poisoned Yang Hao and declared a new state of Xu with himself as emperor.

In 619, Yuwen Huaji was captured and executed by one of the rebel leaders, Dou Jiande the Prince of Xia. Dou treated Empress Xiao with kindness and respect while giving a proper mourning for Emperor Yang. Subsequently, the Princess Yicheng requested that Dou send Empress Xiao to her, and Dou did so, along with Emperor Yang's daughter Princess Nanyang and the head of Yuwen Huaji. An emissary was sent to welcome her and the former Empress traveled to Tujue, North of the Great Wall. While she was in Tujue, one of Yang Shiku's consorts gave birth to a posthumous son, Yang Zhengdao, whom she raised, and whom Ashina Duojishi subsequently created the Prince of Sui, assigning to him as his subjects the refugees from Sui. She went to live in Dingxiang. During the years, Tujue's khans continued to use Yang Zhengdao as a magnet to attract the people to surrender, in competition to the Tang dynasty, established by the Sui general Li Yuan (Emperor Gaozu).

In 630, when Emperor Gaozu's son Emperor Taizong of Tang sent the general Li Jing to attack Tujue's Jiali Khan Ashina Duobi, Ashina Duobi's associate Kangsumi (康蘇密) surrendered to Li Jing, taking Empress Xiao and Yang Zhengdao with him. Emperor Taizong's official Yang Wenguan (楊文瓘) wanted to have Empress Xiao interrogated as to whether any Tang officials had been secretly in communication with her, but Emperor Taizong refused and instead treated her with respect. Yang Zhengdao was given an honorific official post. As Empress Xiao's brother Xiao Yu was an important official under both Emperors Gaozu and Taizong, she maintained some degree of honor at the Tang capital Chang'an, and she was subsequently in charge of Emperor Yang's reburial with honor. She died on 17 April 648 in Chang'an and was buried with honors due an empress, at Jiangdu with Emperor Yang.

Chinese royalty
Preceded by Empress Dugu	Empress of the Sui dynasty 605–618	Succeeded by None (dynasty destroyed)
Preceded by Empress Dugu	Empress of China (most regions); 605–618	Succeeded by Empress Zhangsun of the Tang dynasty
Preceded by Empress Dugu	Empress of China (Hebei); 605–617	Succeeded by Empress Cao of Xia
Preceded by Empress Dugu	Empress of China (Shanxi); 605–617	Succeeded by Empress Ju of Dingyang
Preceded by Empress Dugu	Empress of China (Eastern Gansu); 605–617	Succeeded by Empress Ju of Qin
