= Yami Qaghan =

Yami Khagan
- First Khagan of the Eastern Turkic Khaganate
- Reign: 603–609
- Predecessor: Tardu
- Successor: Shibi Qaghan
- Born: Ashina Rangan 阿史那染幹
- Died: 609
- Spouse: Princess Anyi (安义公主) Princess Yicheng (義成公主)
Regnal name
- 意利珍豆啟民可汗; Yìlì Zhēndòu Qǐmín Kěhàn; El Ïduk Jamï(r) Qağan
- House: Ashina
- Father: Ishbara Qaghan
- Religion: Tengrism

Yami Qaghan (Old Turkic: 𐰖𐰢𐰃:𐰴𐰍𐰣 Jаmï qağan; (Note: This first qaghan of the Eastern Turks is identified with Jamï Qağan on Ongin inscription Meanwhile W. Radloff, basing on similarities of letters "b" and "y", identifies Ongin inscription's Yiamy kagan as Bumyn kagan (d. 552 AD)), the founder of the First Turkic Khaganate (H.N.Orkhun); Bumyn kagan (S.E Malov), G.Aidarov, Yamï qaγan (T.Tekin), Yamï qaγan (L.Bold), according I. Markwart, Yiamy kagan is Bumyn/Tumen. Ünal (2014) proposes that Ongin's Yama Qaghan corresponds to Chinese 射摩 Shè-mó (< MC *ʑia-ma) and Old Tibetan transcription Zhama) Chinese: 啓民可汗, 啟民可汗/启民可汗; Pinyin: Qǐmín Kěhàn, Wade-Giles: Ch'i-min K'o-han, Middle Chinese (Guangyun): [kʰiei˥mi̯en˩ kʰɑ˥ɣɑn˩˥]), personal name Ashina Rangan (阿史那染幹/阿史那染干, pinyin Āshǐnà rǎngān; Wade-Giles A-shih-na jan-kan, [ʔɑʃi̯ə˥nɑ˩ nʑi̯ɛm˥kɑn˩˥]), at one point known as Tolis Qaghan (突利可汗, 𐱅𐰇𐰠𐰾𐰴𐰍𐰣, Töles qaγan) and later El Ïduk Jamï(r) Qağan (意利珍豆啟民可汗/意利珍豆启民可汗, Yìlì Zhēndòu Qǐmín Kěhàn) was the first qaghan of the Eastern Turkic Khaganate.

== Background ==
Yami Qaghan was born as Ashina Rangan, he was either son of Bagha Qaghan or Ishbara Qaghan. He was a subordinate khagan under Tulan Qaghan with title of Tolis Qaghan, ruling eastern tribes.

He sent an ambassador to the Sui dynasty in 597, requesting to marry to a Chinese princess. Pei Ju saw this as opportunity and told him to kill Tulan Qaghan's Zhou origin khatun Princess Qianjin (who was styled as Princess Dayi by Sui dynasty). Princess Qianjin was murdered and Yami was sent Princess Anyi (安义公主) to marry.

However, Rangan's ambitious behaviour outraged Tulan Qaghan. Tulan started to gather an invasion party to attack the Sui in 597 and 599, only to be reported to the Emperor beforehand by Rangan on both occasions. As a reaction, Tulan approached Tardu to combine forces and attack Rangan. The attack was a success and Rangan had to flee to China after his brothers and nephews were killed during the attack.

In the winter of 599, he was made Qimin Khagan by Emperor Wen. Meanwhile Princess Anyi died and he was married to Princess Yicheng, a daughter of Yang Xie (杨谐). The Emperor commissioned Zhangsun Sheng to build the city of Dali (大利, in modern Hohhot) to house Qimin's people, and sent an army to protect Qimin.

Meanwhile Tulan was killed by his men causing Tardu to assume throne and claim title Bilge Khagan in 599 or 600.

In the winter of 601, Emperor Wen commissioned Yang Su to command an army, in association with Qimin Khagan (Rangan) as to attack Tardu.

== Reign ==
After Tardu's subsequent defeat in 603, he fled to Tuyuhun. Having a cleared way Rangan assumed the throne of eastern wing with the regnal name Yami Qaghan, definitely starting the division between the western and eastern wings of the khaganate.

In the spring of 607, Yami went to Luoyang to visit Emperor Yang. In the summer, he was visited back by Yang. Much pleased from Yami's display of submission and loyalty, Emperor Yang bestowed much honor and wealth on him. When the senior officials Gao Jiong, Yuwen Bi (宇文弼), and Heruo Bi privately expressed disapproval, Emperor Yang discovered their criticism and put them all to death while removing Su Wei –who also discouraged him from giving excessive rewards to Yami– from his post.

In the spring of 609, Yami made another visit to Emperor Yang and was rewarded with much treasure. He later died from an illness and succeeded by his son, Shibi.

== Family ==
He was married to Princess Anyi (安义公主) at first and later her death to Princess Yicheng (義成公主). He also had a Tuyuhun concubine or wife. He had several children:

- Shibi Qaghan
- Ashina Xichun
- Illig Qaghan
- Yento shad (延陀設)
- Chiji shad (叱吉設)
- Börü shad (步利設)

== Sources ==
- Book of Sui, vol. 84.
- History of the Northern Dynasties, vol. 99.
- Zizhi Tongjian vols 179, 180, 181.
  Yami Qaghan Ashina Clan
  Preceded by Tulan Qaghan	Khagan of the Eastern Turkic Khaganate; 603–609	Succeeded by Shibi Qaghan
