= Emperor Yang of Sui =

Emperor of China from 604 to 618

Emperor Yang of Sui 隋煬帝
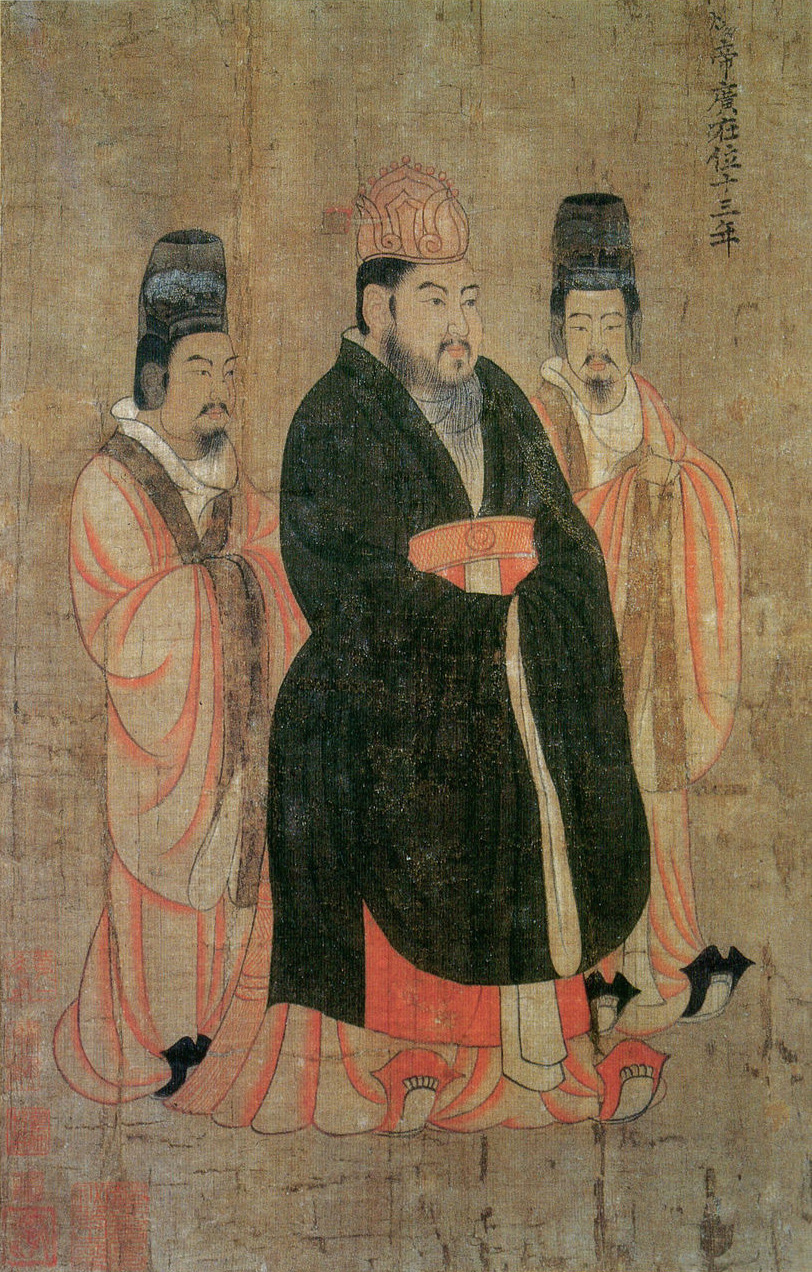
- Tang dynasty portrait of Emperor Yang by Yan Liben

Emperor of the Sui dynasty
- Reign: 21 August 604 – 11 April 618
- Predecessor: Emperor Wen
- Successor: Yang You
- Born: 569
- Died: 11 April 618 (aged 49); Danyang, Sui China
- Burial: Jiangdu
- Consorts: Empress Min
- Issue: Yang Zhao; Yang Jian; Yang Gao; Princess Nanyang
Names
- Yang Guang 楊廣
Era dates
- Daye (大業; 605–618)
Posthumous name
- Emperor Yang (煬皇帝; "slothful") (conferred by the Tang dynasty); Emperor Ming (明皇帝; "understanding") (conferred by Yang Tong); Emperor Min (閔皇帝; "careful") (conferred by Dou Jiande)
Temple name
- Shizu (世祖)
- House: Yang
- Dynasty: Sui
- Father: Emperor Wen
- Mother: Empress Wenxian

Emperor Yang of Sui (Chinese: 隋煬帝, 569 – 11 April 618), personal name Yang Guang (楊廣), alternative name Ying (英), childhood name Amo (阿摩), Xianbei name Puliuru Guang (普六茹廣), was the second emperor of the Sui dynasty of China.

Emperor Yang's original name was Yang Ying, but he was renamed by his father Emperor Wen, after consulting with oracles, to Yang Guang. Yang Guang was made the Prince of Jin after Emperor Wen established the Sui dynasty in 581. In 588, he was granted command of the five armies that invaded the Chen dynasty in southern China and was widely praised for the success of this campaign. These military achievements, as well as his machinations against his older brother Yang Yong, led to him becoming crown prince in 600. After the death of his father in 604, generally considered, though unproven, by most traditional historians to be a murder ordered by Yang Guang, he ascended the Sui throne.

Emperor Yang, ruling from 604 to 618, committed to several large construction projects, most notably the completion of the Grand Canal, and the reconstruction of the Great Wall. He also ordered several military expeditions that brought Sui to its greatest territorial extent, one of which, the conquest of Champa, resulted in the death of thousands of Sui soldiers from malaria. These expeditions, along with a series of disastrous campaigns against Goguryeo, left the empire bankrupt and the populace in revolt. With northern China in turmoil, Emperor Yang spent his last days in Jiangdu (江都, in modern Yangzhou, Jiangsu), where he was eventually strangled in a coup led by his general Yuwen Huaji.

Despite his accomplishments, Emperor Yang is generally considered by traditional historians to be one of the worst tyrants in Chinese history and the reason for the Sui dynasty's relatively short rule. His failed campaigns against Goguryeo, and the conscriptions levied to man them, coupled with increased taxation to finance these wars, and civil unrest as a result of this taxation, ultimately led to the downfall of the dynasty.

== Background ==
Yang Guang was born in 569, during the reign of Emperor Wu of Northern Zhou. His parents were Yang Jian, the Duke of Sui, and Yang Jian's wife Duchess Dugu Qieluo; his maternal grandfather was Dugu Xin, a prominent military general and official. He was his parents' second son, after Yang Yong, and he had at least one older sister, Yang Lihua, who became the wife of Emperor Wu's crown prince Yuwen Yun (the later Emperor Xuan) in 573. He was considered handsome and intelligent in his youth, and of Yang Jian's and Duchess Dugu's sons, they favored him the most. Sometime during Northern Zhou, on account of Yang Jian's achievements, he was created the Duke of Yanmen.

In 580, Yang Jian seized power as regent after Emperor Xuan's death. In 581, he had Emperor Xuan's son (by the concubine Zhu Manyue), Emperor Jing, yield the throne to him, ending Northern Zhou and establishing the Sui dynasty as its Emperor Wen. Emperor Wen created Yang Yong crown prince and created his other sons imperial princes. Yang Guang thus received the title of Prince of Jin.

== As Prince of Jin ==
Also in 581, Emperor Wen made Yang Guang the commandant at Bing Province (并州, roughly modern Taiyuan, Shanxi), in charge of the provinces north of the Yellow River. In 582, Emperor Wen set up a branch of the executive bureau of his government (尚書省; Shangshu Sheng) at Bing Province and made Yang Guang its head. He made the official Wang Shao (王韶) the deputy head and had him assist Yang Guang. Later in 582, Emperor Wen took a daughter of his vassal Emperor Ming of Western Liang (Xiao Kui) to be Yang Guang's wife and princess. It was said that Yang Guang loved and respected her.

In 584, after some Sui military and diplomatic victories, Tujue's Shabolüe Khan Ashina Shetu submitted to Sui. Yang Guang suggested to Emperor Wen that he rejected Ashina Shetu's overture and launch a major attack on Tujue, but Emperor Wen refused. In 585, with Ashina Shetu under attack from one of his subordinate khans, the Datou Khan Ashina Dianjue, Emperor Wen in fact sent Yang Guang to aid Ashina Shetu.

In 588, Emperor Wen moved Yang Guang's headquarters to Shouchun (壽春, in modern Lu'an, Anhui), and made him the commandant there as well as the head the branch of the executive bureau established there. In winter 588, Emperor Wen launched a major attack on the rival Chen dynasty. Yang Guang, his brother Yang Jun, and the general Yang Su were in command of the three main prongs of the operation, with Yang Guang in command of the eastern prong as well as the overall operation. The key official Gao Jiong served as Yang Guang's assistant. In spring 589, the generals Han Qinhu (韓擒虎) and Heruo Bi (賀若弼), both under Yang Guang, crossed the Yangtze River and approached the Chen capital Jiankang. Soon, after Heruo defeated the Chen general Xiao Mohe, Jiankang fell, and the Chen emperor Chen Shubao was captured. Yang Guang, apparently fascinated by Chen Shubao's favorite concubine Consort Zhang Lihua, sent Gao Jiong's son Gao Dehong (高德弘) to order Gao Jiong to hold Consort Zhang. Instead, Gao Jiong, comparing Consort Zhang to Daji (the wicked wife of Di Xin), beheaded her. Yang Guang thereafter resented Gao greatly, stating sarcastically, "It has been said, 'You should repay every good deed done to you.' I will repay Duke Gao later." By Yang Guang's orders, several of Chen Shubao's favorite officials, who were considered reasons for Chen's downfall, including Shi Wenqing (施文慶), Shen Keqing (沈客卿), Yang Huilang (陽慧朗), Xu Xi (徐析), and Ji Huijing (暨慧景), were executed. It was said that the people praised Yang Guang for his actions. Chen Shubao and his own clan members, however, were treated with kindness, and at Yang Guang's request, Chen Shubao sent letters to Chen generals who had not yet surrendered to persuade them to do so, and they largely did. Later that year, Yang Guang's forces escorted them to the capital Chang'an. At the ceremony to present Chen Shubao to Emperor Wen, Yang Guang marched into the palace first, and Emperor Wen bestowed on Yang Guang decorated wagons, horses, clothing, and jade. Afterwards, Yang Jun was given the Yang Province (then moved to modern Yangzhou, Jiangsu) commandant post, and Yang Guang was returned to Bing Province. In 590, Emperor Wen swapped the defense posts of Yang Jun and Yang Guang, returning Yang Guang to Yang Province.

In 594, Yang Guang urged Emperor Wen to offer sacrifices to Mount Tai—a traditional ceremony for emperors, but one that was rarely carried out. Emperor Wen rejected the elaborate traditional ceremonies, but did carry out a reduced ceremony at Mount Tai.

In spring 600, with Ashina Dianjue, who had by now become Tujue's khan, attacking the borders, Emperor Wen sent Yang Guang, Yang Su the Duke of Yue, Yang Guang's brother Yang Liang the Prince of Han, and Shi Wansui (史萬歲) the Duke of Taiping, against Tujue, and they were largely successful against Ashina Dianjue, protecting the Qimin Khan Ashina Rangan, whom Sui supported, from Ashina Dianjue's attack.

By 600, Yang Guang's older brother Yang Yong had lost the favors of Emperor Wen and Empress Dugu—over his wastefulness (which displeased Emperor Wen) and his having many concubines (which displeased Empress Dugu). Yang Guang, by contrast, pretended to be frugal and loving only Princess Xiao. (It was written that Yang Guang did have concubines, but he pretended that he did not, and that he forced his concubines to have abortions if they became pregnant.) Yang Guang further inflamed Empress Dugu by informing her that she believed that Yang Yong was determined to kill him eventually. Empress Yang thus resolved to remove Yang Yong. Yang Guang further had his associate Yuwen Shu persuade Yang Su's brother Yang Yue (楊約) that, because Yang Su's relationship with Yang Yong was not good, that their family would be in peril should Yang Yong succeed Emperor Wen. Finally, Yang Guang also had Yang Yong's associate Ji Wei (姬威) accuse Yang Yong of plotting treason. Emperor Wen had Yang Su investigate, and Yang Guang and Yang Su manufactured evidence against Yang Yong. Emperor Wen deposed Yang Yong and replaced him with Yang Guang on 13 December 600, putting Yang Yong under house arrest under Yang Guang's watch. Yang Guang later prevented Yang Yong from all attempts of seeing his parents again.

== As crown prince ==
It is widely believed that Yang Guang also continued to scheme to secure his status as the crown prince. Such commonly believed tales include the following:

By 602, his brother, Yang Xiu the Prince of Shu, who, was commandant of Yi Province (roughly modern Chengdu, Sichuan), and had great resources at his disposal. Yang Guang collected evidence of Yang Xiu's wrongdoing, particularly wastefulness, and had Yang Su submit them to Emperor Wen. Emperor Wen summoned Yang Xiu back to the capital and had Yang Su investigate, and both Yang Guang and Yang Su further manufactured evidence against Yang Xiu. Emperor Wen reduced Yang Xiu to commoner rank and put him under house arrest.

Also in 602, Empress Dugu died. It was said that Yang Guang pretended to mourn greatly, refusing most foods, but in private continued to dine normally.

In 604, while Emperor Wen was at his vacation palace Renshou Palace (仁壽宮, in modern Baoji, Shaanxi), he fell ill and then died—a death, however, that traditional historians, while admitting a lack of direct evidence, believed to be a murder ordered by Yang Guang (see below). Yang Guang, after sending Yang Yue to kill Yang Yong, announced Emperor Wen's death and took the throne as Emperor Yang.

== Early reign ==
An immediate challenge that Emperor Yang faced was a rebellion by his brother Yang Liang, then the commandant at Bing Province, who was encouraged by the generals Wang Kui (王頍) and Xiao Mohe. Yang Liang received support from 19 provinces, but lacked a coherent plan as to whether to try to challenge Emperor Yang for the control of the entire empire, or just the region north of the Yellow River. After some initial successes, Yang Liang's offenses stalled. Emperor Yang sent Yang Su against him, and Yang Su proceeded quickly to Yang Liang's headquarters at Bing Province, capturing Xiao and forcing Yang Liang to surrender. Emperor Yang did not execute Yang Liang, but reduced him to commoner rank and imprisoned him for the rest of his life.

In winter 604, believing in the words of the sorcerer Zhangchou Taiyi (章仇太翼) that the geography of Chang'an was not conducive to his health, Emperor Yang went to Luoyang, designating it as the eastern capital, and would rarely return to Chang'an thereafter. He ordered that major construction projects be carried out at Luoyang, commensurate with the necessities of having it as the actual capital, and he left his oldest son, Yang Zhao the Prince of Jin, in charge of Chang'an. He conscripted several hundred thousands of young men to dig a lengthy trench to surround the Luoyang region, intending that it serve as a defense perimeter. He also ordered that women and servants be exempted from head taxes, and that men would only be considered adults (i.e., subject to conscription) when they turn 21.

In spring 605, Emperor Yang created his wife Crown Princess Xiao empress, and Yang Zhao as crown prince. He also abolished the offices of military commandants. He, at this time, trusted Empress Xiao's brother Xiao Cong the Duke of Ju (Western Liang's last emperor) and made him, as well as many of her other relatives, important officials, creating him the greater title of Duke of Liang.

Starting in 605, Emperor Yang also started a massive number of construction projects—including the building of the imperial palace at Luoyang, described to be particularly luxurious. Further, he conscripted a large number of men to build the Tongji Canal (通濟渠), connecting Luoyang with the Yellow River and connecting the Yellow River with the Huai River, as well as to rebuild the Han Canal (邗溝), connecting the Huai River and the Yangtze River. The two canals, which would eventually become parts of the Grand Canal of China, were said to be constructed within five months, but at substantial cost of life—40% to 50% of the men employed. Emperor Yang also ordered that some 40 secondary palaces be built around the empire, so that he could visit the various provinces, arguing that he needed to do so to see the conditions of the empire so that he could govern effectively.

In fall 605, after the completion of the Tongji and Han Canals, Emperor Yang carried out the first of 11 (counting military campaigns) tours that he would eventually undertake of various parts of the empire, going to Jiangdu—the capital of Yang Province, where he had been commandant previously—on an imperial ship that was said to be sufficiently large and luxurious to serve as floating palaces.

Also in 605, when Khitan tribes attacked Ying Province (營州, roughly modern Zhaoyang, Liaoning), Emperor Yang had the official Wei Yunqi (韋雲起) requisition Tujue troops under Ashina Rangan to attack Khitan. The Khitan forces were caught by surprise and defeated.

In summer 606, Yang Zhao the Crown Prince became ill while visiting Luoyang, and soon died. Emperor Yang would not create another crown prince for the rest of his reign, creating Yang Zhao's sons Yang Tan (楊倓), Yang Tong, and Yang You imperial princes, while initially apparently tacitly considering his second son, Yang Jian the Prince of Qi (note different character than Emperor Wen) the de facto successor, leaving Yang Jian in charge of Luoyang whenever he would be away from Luoyang. Yang Su, whom Emperor Yang pretended to respect but actually feared, also died in summer 606.

Also in 606, Emperor Yang ordered that two massive food storages—the Luokou Storage (洛口倉) and the Huiluo Storage (回洛倉) – be constructed near Luoyang.

In spring 607, Ashina Rangan visited Emperor Yang at Luoyang. Also in spring 607, at the instigation of Yuwen Shu, Emperor Yang had Yang Yong's eight sons put to death.

In summer 607, Emperor Yang abolished provinces and changed them to commanderies. At the same time, he reorganized his father's governmental system of having five main bureaus, keeping four of the main bureaus—the executive bureau (尚書省; Shangshu Sheng), the examination bureau (門下省; Menxia Sheng), the legislative bureau (內史省; Neishi Sheng), the Palace Library – while abolishing the eunuch bureau and replacing it with the palace bureau (殿內省; Diannei Sheng). He established three additional independent agencies and five independent departments. He also organized the imperial army into 16 corps. He abolished three levels of noble titles—the counts, the viscounts, and the barons—keeping only the princes, the dukes, and the marquesses.

Also in summer 607, Emperor Yang embarked on a tour of the northern provinces, building an imperial highway from Chang'an to Jinyang (晉陽, the capital of Bing Province). He then personally visited the imperial tent of Ashina Rangan, whose display of submission and loyalty caused Emperor Yang to bestow much honor and wealth on him. When the senior officials Gao Jiong, Yuwen Bi (宇文弼), and Heruo Bi privately expressed disapproval, Emperor Yang discovered their criticism and put all of them to death, while removing Su Wei, who also discouraged him from giving excessive rewards to Ashina Rangan, from his post. (Traditional historians attribute Gao's death to Gao's refusal to keep Chen Shubao's Consort Zhang alive in 589.) As Xiao Cong had a deep friendship with Heruo Bi, and there had been rumors that the Xiaos would rise again, the superstitious Emperor Yang also removed Xiao Cong from his post. Qimin visited Yangdi at Yulin.

The Grand Canal of Sui, linking Jiangnan and Chang'an together, with different completion dates over each segment

Also in 607, at the instigation of Pei Ju, Emperor Yang reopened relations with Xiyu states. In spring 608, Emperor Yang conscripted over a million men to construct the Yongji Canal (永濟渠), from the Yellow River to Zhuo Commandery (涿郡, roughly modern Beijing). It was said that there were not enough men, and he started conscripting women as well.

In 608, after persuasion by the Sui official Cui Junsu (崔君肅), the Western Tujue khan (Ashina Rangan's western rival), the Heshana Khan Ashina Daman, whose mother was Han, submitted to Sui as a vassal. However, also in 608, Emperor Yang received a letter claiming to be from the Emperor of Japan, Duolisibigu (多利思比孤, now commonly believed to be Prince Shōtoku), stating, "The Son of Heaven where the sun rises, to the Son of Heaven where the sun sets, may good health be with you." Displeased by what he saw as insolence, he ordered that in the future, "insolent" letters from other states not be submitted to him.

Also in 608, initially over disputes over women (Yang Jian's having taken a concubine that Emperor Yang himself wanted) and hunting (Yang Jian's guards having been much more successful than Emperor Yang's guards at hunting), Emperor Yang's relationship with Yang Jian began to deteriorate. He ordered investigations into Yang Jian's violation of laws, and discovered that Yang Jian had used witchcraft to curse Yang Zhao's three sons. In anger, Emperor Yang executed and exiled a number of Yang Jian's associates, but he did not depose Yang Jian, although from this point on Yang Jian did not exert much influence on the political scene.

In 608 as well, Pei Ju persuaded the Tiele tribes to attack Tuyuhun, forcing Tuyuhun's Busabuo Khan Murong Fuyun to flee. Murong Fuyun initially considered submitting to Sui, and Emperor Yang sent Yuwen with an army to welcome him. However, when Murong Fuyun changed his mind, Yuwen attacked him and seized much of Tuyuhun's people. When Murong Fuyun fled further, Emperor Yang had his forces seize Tuyuhun's territory, establishing four commanderies, to be populated with exiles.

== Middle reign ==
In spring 609, Ashina Rangan made another visit to Emperor Yang, and Emperor Yang again rewarded him with much treasure.

Also in spring 609, Emperor Yang ordered a redistribution of the farming land throughout the empire.

Later in spring 609, Emperor Yang conducted a tour of the newly conquered Tuyuhun territory, and sent several generals to chase down Murong Fuyun. The Sui forces engaged Murong Fuyun's remaining forces, with mixed success, but Murong Fuyun was forced to flee to Dangxiang tribes. Emperor Yang tried to impose Murong Fuyun's son Murong Shun, whom Murong Fuyun had earlier sent to Sui as a hostage, as Tuyuhun's new khan, but the Tuyuhun people would not accept him, and Murong Shun was forced back to Sui territory. Emperor Yang also received 27 rulers of Xiyu kingdoms in an audience at Zhangye (張掖, in modern Zhangye, Gansu).

Later in the year, Ashina Rangan died, and was succeeded by his son Shibi Khan Ashina Duojishi. Pursuant to Tujue customs, Ashina Duojishi requested permission from Emperor Yang to marry Ashina Rangan's wife Princess Yicheng (義成公主) (the daughter of a clansman of Emperor Yang). Emperor Yang agreed. Also in 609, Emperor Yang, jealous of the literary talent of the official Xue Daoheng (薛道衡), he falsely accused Xue of defaming the emperor and had Xue strangled.

By this time, it was said that Emperor Yang's lifestyle had become particularly wasteful, and that he no longer felt bound by moral principles.

In 610, Emperor Yang visited Jiangdu again, and this time elevated Jiangdu's importance so that it effectively became a third capital.

When Emperor Yang was visiting Ashina Rangan in 607, a messenger from Goguryeo's King King Yeong-yang to Ashina Rangan happened to be present, and Ashina Rangan introduced him to Emperor Yang. Emperor Yang ordered King Yeong-yang to come visit him, offering to reward him if he did so and to punish him if he did not do so. King Yeong-yang did not respond, and by 611, Emperor Yang, insulted by the lack of response, prepared a campaign against Goguryeo. With Sui appearing to be in its prime, both governmental officials and the people were initially in support of a campaign to conquer Goguryeo. In spring 611, Emperor Yang went to Zhuo Commandery and announced the campaign against Goguryeo. Several hundred men were conscripted, and it was said that even before they could get to Zhuo Commandery, disease and fatigue had already caused much loss of life. In response, a number of conscripted soldiers deserted and became agrarian rebels.

Also in 611, angry that Western Tujue's khan Ashina Daman, while nominally submissive, had refused to visit him, Emperor Yang had Pei Ju persuade Ashina Daman's subordinate khan Ashina Shegui (阿史那射匱) to rebel against Ashina Daman, promising to give him a Sui princess in marriage. Ashina Shegui thus rebelled against Ashina Daman, forcing Ashina Daman to flee, first to Gaochang, then to Sui. Emperor Yang accepted Ashina Daman's submission, and thereafter divided his people into three groups, while leaving Ashina Daman as titular khan, although he never allowed Ashina Daman to return to his people.

By 612, the soldiers had been gathered at Zhuo Commandery, and Emperor Yang launched his attack, attacking a number of cities in Goguryeo territory, but targeting mainly at the important city of Liaodong (遼東, in modern Liaoyang, Liaoning) and Goguryeo's capital Pyongyang. However, contrary to the desires of the generals, Emperor Yang ordered that their tactical decisions must first be submitted to and approved by him before they could be carried out. Thus all the Goguryeo forts and cities were able to withstand Sui forces and thus there was not much chance of Manchuria being successfully conquered. Emperor Yang, however, made a new plan to keep the Goguryeo forts at bay while sending another army, alongside the navy. to siege the Goguryeo capital. The navy arrived first and with a haste order, the navy attacked the capital but were defeated by ambush. The navy then waited for the land army to arrive. The supply of food had also been greatly delayed and many Sui soldiers died of famine. Then the Goguryeo General Eulji Meundeok rallied Goguryeo forces, and constantly harassed them with ambushes and feigned retreats. The Sui army had come to the Salsu River, but Eulji and the Goguryeo forces were waiting in ambush. A dam was made at the Salsu River to make the river seem it was shallow. When the Sui army was in the middle of the River, the dam was opened and many Sui soldiers drowned. Out of the 305,000 men that entered the river, only 2,700 soldiers escaped death. Thus the Sui army, or what was left of it, retreated back to Sui. This war had, however, resulted in devastating losses for the Sui in terms of soldiers, money and support from the people.

In winter 612, Emperor Yang gave a daughter of a clansman, whom he created the Princess Huarong, to Qu Boya (麴伯雅) (the king of Gaochang) in marriage

In spring 613, Emperor Yang again ordered that soldiers be gathered at Zhuo Commandery, as he prepared a second campaign against Goguryeo. He also selected the most elite of the soldiers into a specialized corps, the Xiaoguo Army (驍果, meaning, "the strong and brave"). Thereafter, the Xiaoguo Army became his own personal guards. In response to the conscription order, even more men deserted and joined the agrarian rebels, throwing the northern central part of the empire into a state of confusion. With the officials on command having little military training, the rebels went largely unchecked. One notable exception was general Zhang Xutuo (張須陀), who was able to defeat some of the rebels, but even he was not able to succeed in suppressing them.

In summer 613, Emperor Yang crossed the Liao River again and put Manchuria under siege. However, at this time, news arrived that Yang Su's son Yang Xuangan had rebelled near Luoyang. With the people disaffected by the Goguryeo campaigns, Yang Xuangan received much popular support and threatened Luoyang. Emperor Yang, in fear, lifted the siege on Liaodong and also ordered the southern offensive to be terminated, returning to Zhuo Commandery while sending Yuwen and Qutu Tong (屈突通) south to aid Luoyang. The general in charge of defending Chang'an, Wei Wensheng (衛文昇), also came to Luoyang's aid. Together, these forces outnumbered Yang Xuangan's and dealt him several defeats. Yang Xuangan decided to try to advance west to capture Chang'an as a base of operations, but on the way was again defeated, and he had his brother Yang Jishan (楊積善) kill him, to avoid capture. At Emperor Yang's orders, the officials Fan Zigai (樊子蓋) and Pei Yun (裴蘊) carried out mass-scale reprisals, executing a large number of people who had followed Yang Xuangan. Around the new year 614, by Emperor Yang's orders, Yang Jishan and Yang Xuangan's strategist Wei Fusi (韋福嗣) were publicly executed in exceedingly cruel manners—the officials all fired arrows at them, and then they were further drawn and quartered, and then their bodies were burned and the ashes scattered.

Around the same time, there were also rebellions south of the Yangtze River, and Emperor Yang sent the official Wang Shichong against the rebels. Wang was able to suppress the rebellions, for the most part, and thereafter began to rise in prominence at Emperor Yang's court. Meanwhile, Emperor Yang ordered that rebels' possessions could be confiscated at will. The local officials, however, used this as an excuse to execute and confiscate properties of those they did not like.

== Late reign ==
In spring 614, Emperor Yang again proposed another campaign against Goguryeo. Although his officials did not approve, none dared to oppose him. Many of the soldiers ordered to report to Zhuo Commandery deserted. Emperor Yang tried to stop desertions by executing those who deserted, but still could not stem the tide of desertions. Goguryeo forces had also been constantly ambushing the Sui army and the Sui supply line. Goguryeo offered peace, for Goguryeo had also been exhausted. Goguryeo also returned Yang Xuangan's associate Husi Zheng (斛斯政), who had fled to Goguryeo after his association with Yang Xuangan was discovered. Lai initially opposed ending the campaign, but did finally withdraw after ordered by Emperor Yuan. Emperor Yang executed Husi using the same kind of cruelty that he employed against Yang Jishan and Wei Fusi, but afterwards, when he again summoned Goguryeo's King Yeong-yang to meet him, King Yeong-yang again ignored him. Emperor Yang declared a fourth campaign against Goguryeo—but he never actually launched it. Meanwhile, agrarian rebellions continued to rise. While generals such as Zhang Xutuo and Wang Sichong enjoyed victories here and there, the situation was deteriorating for the welfare of the Sui state at large.

In spring 615, believing in accusations by Yuwen Shu that the official Li Hun (李渾) was intending to carry out a coup to replace Emperor Yang with his nephew Li Min (李敏, son-in-law of Emperor Yang's sister Yang Lihua the Princess Leping) and worried about prophecies that someone named Li would become the next emperor, Emperor Yang had Li Hun, Li Min, and their clansmen executed, and further poisoned Yang Lihua's daughter Yuwen Eying (宇文娥英).

Later in 615, Emperor Yang carried out a tour of the northern provinces with the Empress Xiao and much of the imperial court. Shibi Khan, angered that the imperial advisor Pei Ju had promised a princess to his brother Ashina Chiji (阿史那叱吉) and had executed his close advisor Shishu Huxi (史蜀胡悉) under false pretenses, launched a surprise attack on Yanmen Commandery. In accordance with Turkish customs, Princess Yicheng had married him as her husband's successor; having been well treated by the empress during an earlier visit, though, she sent a secret warning of his plans to the emperor and his wife. The imperial train sought refuge at the commandery seat in present-day Daixian, Shanxi, which Shibi Khan and his army put under siege on 11 September. It was said that Emperor Yang became so fearful that he cried all day long while holding onto his youngest son Yang Gao, the Prince of Zhao. Yuwen Shu suggested that Emperor Yang take the most elite guards and try to fight out of the siege, but Su Wei and Fan Zigai opposed this. Empress Xiao's brother Xiao Yu suggested seeking further help from Princess Yicheng, and Emperor Yang did so. Meanwhile, at Yu Shiji's advice, Emperor Yang also personally visited the soldiers defending the city, raising morale by promising to end the campaigns against Goguryeo and to reward them with honors and treasure. Princess Yicheng falsely informed Shibi Khan that the Turks were under attack from the north and relief troops from Luoyang and the other commanderies began arriving, so the khan lifted the siege. With the danger passed and credit muddled, Emperor Yang followed the advice of Su and Yuwen to renege on most of his promises: he did not return to the capital Chang'an, but went to Luoyang instead; he continued to prepare a campaign against Goguryeo; he did not bestow any monetary rewards on the garrison or its reinforcements; and he was sparing in the promotion of the officers involved. When Fan and Xiao Yu reminded him of the promises, Emperor Yang rebuked Fan and demoted Xiao Yu.

Emperor Yang only appeared to begin to be concerned about rebels when, at the Chinese New Year imperial gathering in 616, 20 odd commanderies' messengers did not arrive—either because they had fallen into rebel hands, or because their messengers were intercepted or killed on the way. Only then did Emperor Yang begin talking about suppressing the rebels. Apparently beginning to consider the idea of evacuating to south of the Yangtze River, he ordered that a major palace be built at Piling Commandery (毗陵, roughly modern Changzhou, Jiangsu), and that another palace be built in Kuaiji Commandery. However, he did not like to hear news about rebels, and when Su expressed concerns about the rebels, Emperor Yang had Su falsely accused of crimes and initially was poised to execute him, but instead demoted him to commoner rank.

By fall 616, Emperor Yang had resolved to go to Jiangdu, at Yuwen Shu's suggestion. A number of officials opposed, reasoning that if he left Luoyang, Luoyang would fall into enemy hands; Emperor Yang punished all, some with execution, and proceeded to Jiangdu. He wrote a farewell poem to the ladies in waiting in Luoyang, which included two lines that read:

I dream of Jiangdu's beauty;
And it was only occasional that I advance past the Liao River.

Once Emperor Yang left Luoyang, Yang Xuangan's former strategist Li Mi, who by this point was advising the rebel general Zhai Rang, advised Zhai to directly assault the Luoyang region. Zhai agreed, and killed Zhang Xutuo in a battle; thereafter, the morale of the Sui troops became greatly damaged. Zhai, believing in the prophecies about the next emperor being a Li, began to honor Li Mi as his leader. Meanwhile, the Sui general Yang Yichen was having success against the rebels north of the Yellow River, killing Zhang Jincheng (張金稱) and Gao Shida (高士達), but Emperor Yang and his prime minister Yu Shiji, fearful of Yang Yichen's talent, ostensibly promoted Yang Yichen and recalled him to be a minister. Yang Yichen died soon thereafter, and the rebels north of the Yellow River reinvigorated themselves under Dou Jiande. By 617, several other major rebels had also emerged, including:

- Du Fuwei, agrarian rebel, occupying the modern southern Anhui region.
- Gao Kaidao, agrarian rebel, occupying the modern extremely northern Hebei region.
- Liang Shidu, agrarian rebel, occupying the modern central Inner Mongolia region, declaring himself the Emperor of Liang.
- Li Gui, formerly a Sui official, occupying the modern central and western Gansu region, declaring himself the Prince of Liang.
- Li Yuan, formerly a Sui official (and Emperor Yang's cousin), occupying the modern central Shanxi region, announcing that he wanted to make Emperor Yang's grandson Yang You the Prince of Dai, then at Chang'an, emperor.
- Lin Shihong, agrarian rebel, occupying the modern Jiangxi and Guangdong region, declaring himself the Emperor of Chu.
- Liu Wuzhou, agrarian rebel, occupying the modern northern Shanxi region, declaring himself the Dingyang Khan.
- Luo Yi, former a Sui general, occupying the modern Beijing region.
- Xiao Xi, formerly a Sui official, a grandson of Emperor Xuan of Western Liang, occupying the modern Hubei, Hunan, and Guangxi region, declaring himself the Emperor of Liang.
- Xue Ju, agrarian rebel, occupying the modern eastern Gansu and western Shaanxi region, declaring himself the Hegemonic Prince of Western Qin.
- Zhu Can, formerly a Sui official, roving with his army in the modern southern Henan and southeastern Shaanxi region, first declaring himself the Prince of Jialuolou, and then the Emperor of Chu.

By spring 617, Li Mi and Zhai had captured Emperor Yang's main food storages near Luoyang, the Luokou and Huiluo Storages, thus keeping their army well-supplied while making the Sui forces at Luoyang beginning to lack food. Li Mi took the title of Duke of Wei, while creating Zhai the Duke of Dong Commandery (although Li soon, fearful of Zhai, killed him and seized Zhai's army). A number of other agrarian rebels at least nominally submitted to Li Mi, including Dou and Li Yuan, and it was often thought at the time that Li Mi would soon be able to become emperor. Emperor Yang sent Wang to Luoyang to aid in its defenses, and Li's offensives stalled. Meanwhile, Li Yuan advanced southwest and captured Chang'an in winter 617. He declared Yang You emperor (as Emperor Gong) while honoring Emperor Yang as Taishang Huang (retired emperor), and he himself wielded actual authority over the western Sui commanderies under the title of Prince of Tang.

Meanwhile, at Jiangdu, it was said that Emperor Yang's lifestyle grew increasingly decadent. His palace contained over 100 chambers, each exceedingly luxurious and full of beautiful women. The women of each chamber would serve as hostesses for a feast each day, and Emperor Yang, Empress Xiao, and Emperor Yang's favored concubines would be their guests. Emperor Yang began to come to the realization that his fall was near, but still commented as if he did not care. It was said that on one occasion, he told Empress Xiao, "There must be many people who want to hurt me. However, I will at least be the Duke of Changcheng [i.e., be like Chen Shubao], and you will at least be like Empress Shen [(Chen Shubao's wife)]. Do not worry. Let us drink and be merry." It was also said that on another occasion, when he was looking in the mirror, he told Empress Xiao, "I have a good neck, and I'm waiting for someone to sever it." Empress Xiao, surprised and distressed by his comment, asked him why he was saying so, and he responded and smiled, "Honor and wealth and poverty and dishonor, as well as pain and pleasure, all come in cycles. Why be distressed?" Meanwhile, not wanting to return to the turbulent north, he discussed with his officials about moving the capital to Danyang (丹楊, in modern Nanjing, Jiangsu). His elite Xiaoguo Army guards, missing their families in the north and realizing that Emperor Yang did not intend to return north, began to desert. Their commanders Sima Dekan (司馬德勘), Yuan Li (元禮), and Pei Qiantong (裴虔通), worried that Emperor Yang would punish them, began considering rebelling and taking the Xiaoguo Army north themselves instead. They associated with a number of other officers and officials, discussing so publicly that even the ladies in waiting began to hear about it. When one reported to Empress Xiao, Empress Xiao had her report to Emperor Yang—but Emperor Yang, not wishing to hear about the bad news, beheaded her. When another reported to Empress Xiao, Empress Xiao no longer permitted her to report to Emperor Yang, figuring that it was too late.

Meanwhile, the Xiaoguo Army officers planning the mutiny had by this time decided on supporting Yuwen Shu's son Yuwen Huaji as their leader. In late spring 618, they launched the coup. They entered the palace and surrounded Emperor Yang, accusing him of crimes. Emperor Yang admitted his faults, but pointed out that he had always treated them well—drawing the response from Sima: "All of the earth is angry at you. It does not stop at just one man." They killed Yang Gao on the spot to show him that they were serious. Emperor Yang offered to swallow poison, but none could be found quickly. He then took off his scarf, and the soldier Linghu Xingda (令狐行達) strangled him with it. The coup participants also killed a number of high-level officials and relatives of Emperor Yang, including Emperor Yang's brother Yang Xiu and his sons, son Yang Jian and his sons, grandson Yang Tan the Prince of Yan, Yu Shiji, Pei Yun, Lai Hu'er, Yuan Chong (袁充), Yuwen Xie (宇文協), Yuwen Jiong (宇文皛), and Xiao Ju (蕭鉅) the Duke of Liang (Empress Xiao's nephew). The only close relative to Emperor Yang who was spared was his nephew Yang Hao, the prince of Qin, who was friendly with Yuwen Huaji's brother Yuwen Zhiji (宇文智及). Yuwen Huaji thereafter declared Yang Hao emperor. Empress Xiao and the ladies in waiting, with no one else to help them, were forced to make makeshift caskets for Emperor Yang and Yang Gao using headboards from their beds. It was not until Yuwen Huaji left Jiangdu that the Sui official Chen Leng (陳稜) buried Emperor Yang with reduced ceremony. In 622, after Li Yuan had established the Tang dynasty, becoming Emperor Gaozu, and had somewhat reunified the empire, he reburied Emperor Yang with honors. The tomb was moved several times, and it was said that because of his immoral behaviour lightning struck the tomb wherever it was relocated.

== Patricide controversy ==
While no allegations were made at the time that Emperor Wen's death was anything other than the result of illness, starting from the time of the succeeding Tang dynasty, it was generally assumed that Emperor Wen was killed on Emperor Yang's orders—although more neutral historians generally assumed it to be true while stating that there was no direct evidence. An example is the Song dynasty historian Sima Guang's Zizhi Tongjian, generally considered one of the most reliable, albeit secondary, sources in Chinese history, which, after mentioning Emperor Wen's death and giving a commentary on Emperor Wen's reign, then gave this account:

After Empress Wenxian [(i.e., Empress Dugu)] died, Emperor Wen greatly favored both Consort Chen (the Lady Xuanhua) and Consort Cai (the Lady Ronghua). Consort Chen was the daughter of Emperor Xuan of Chen. Consort Cai was from Danyang [(丹楊, in modern Nanjing, Jiangsu)]. The Emperor grew ill at Renshou Palace, and was bedridden. Yang Su, the left head of the Shangshu Sheng, Liu Shu [(柳述)], the minister of defense [(Emperor Wen's son-in-law as the husband of his daughter Yang Awu (楊阿五) the Princess Lanling)], and Yuan Yan [(元巖)] the court administrator, were all attending to him. The Emperor ordered the Crown Prince to enter the palace to stay at Dabao Hall [(大寶殿)]. The Crown Prince thought that precautions needed to be taken in case of the Emperor's death, and therefore he personally wrote a secret note to inquire of Yang Su what precautions to take. Yang Su wrote a return note detailing his security precautions, but by error the palace attendants delivered it to the Emperor. The Emperor was greatly displeased. Further, one morning, Consort Chen was going to the latrine. Yang Guang could not resist her beauty, and grabbed her, wanting to have sexual relations with her. She resisted and fled back to the Emperor. The Emperor was surprised by her anxiety and asked her; she shed tears and stated, "The Crown Prince was being indecent to me." The Emperor was shocked and angry, pounding the bed and stating, "Animal! How can I give him the important affairs? Dugu destroyed me!" He then summoned Liu and Yuan, telling them, "Summon my son!" They were about to summon the Crown Prince when he clarified, "Yang Yong!" Liu and Yuan left the palace to write the edict. When Yang Su heard this, he reported to the Crown Prince, and thereafter an edict of the Emperor was forged to arrest Liu and Yuan and detain them at the jail at the Supreme Court. The guards of the Eastern Palace [(i.e., the Crown Prince's guards)] were summoned to take over security from the Renshou Palace guards. Security measures were instituted to disallow entry into or exit out of the palace. Yuwen Shu and Guo Yan [(郭衍)] were put in command. Further, the deputy chief of staff for the Crown Prince's palace, Zhang Heng [(張衡)] entered the Emperor's palace to attend to his medical needs. Zhang expelled all of the ladies in waiting and the eunuchs. Soon thereafter, the Emperor died. Thereafter, there were different views as to how he died. When Consort Chen and the other women of the palace heard of this, they stared at each other in fear and shook with fear. At dusk, the Crown Prince sent a eunuch with a small gold box, personally sealed by the Crown Prince, to be delivered to Consort Chen. When Consort Chen saw it, she, believing that there was poison inside, was very fearful, and did not dare to open it. Only after the eunuch urged her did she open it. Instead, the box contained several tongxin knots [(同心結, a decoration showing love)]. Her ladies in waiting were relieved and became happy, stating to each other, "Finally, death is avoided." Consort Chen, in shame and anger, sat down and refused to accept the box. The ladies in waiting forced her to bow to the eunuch. That night, the Crown Prince ordered Consort Chen to have sexual relations with him.

More detailed versions of the story largely alleged that Zhang Heng personally killed Emperor Wen by pounding his chest and breaking his ribs. The advocates for the theory that Emperor Wen was killed on Emperor Yang's orders also pointed to other circumstantial evidence, including how immediately after Emperor Wen's death Emperor Yang took Consorts Chen and Cai as his concubines. Further, after Zhang lost Emperor Yang's favors and eventually was executed in 612, Zhang lamented at the execution field, "What did I do for him that I can expect to live long?" The warden, apparently believing in the murder theory himself, immediately covered his ears to avoid hearing any details and had Zhang immediately executed. They further pointed out how Liu Shu and Yuan Yan were exiled and Yang Yong executed immediately following Emperor Wen's death.

However, particularly in more recent times, some historians have questioned this theory. They pointed out that in the most official histories written not long after (the Book of Sui and the History of Northern Dynasties), no allegations of patricide was levied against Emperor Yang in either Emperor Wen's or Emperor Yang's biographies, or Zhang's, even though many other accusations were made of Emperor Yang's misrule. Indeed, they pointed out the origin of the murder theory appeared to come from the Daye Lüeji (大業略記) by the early Tang author Zhao Yi (趙毅), in whose version of the story, Consort Cai, not Consort Chen, was the concubine involved. They also pointed out that all of the circumstantial evidence had other plausible explanations—and that, indeed, why were Liu and Yuan not killed if they knew the truth? (Note: A counterargument to the skeptics of the murder theory, however, might be that the Book of Sui itself, considered generally a highly reliable source due to its relatively contemporary nature and the high quality of its other scholarship, itself contained a more conservatively-worded version of the attempted rape and murder accusation in the biography of Consort Chen, although it did not directly accuse Emperor Yang of patricide. The History of Northern Dynasties contained the same account.) However, the idea that Emperor Wen was killed on Emperor Yang's orders has become ingrained in the traditional Chinese mindset, although the truth might never be known.

== Tomb ==
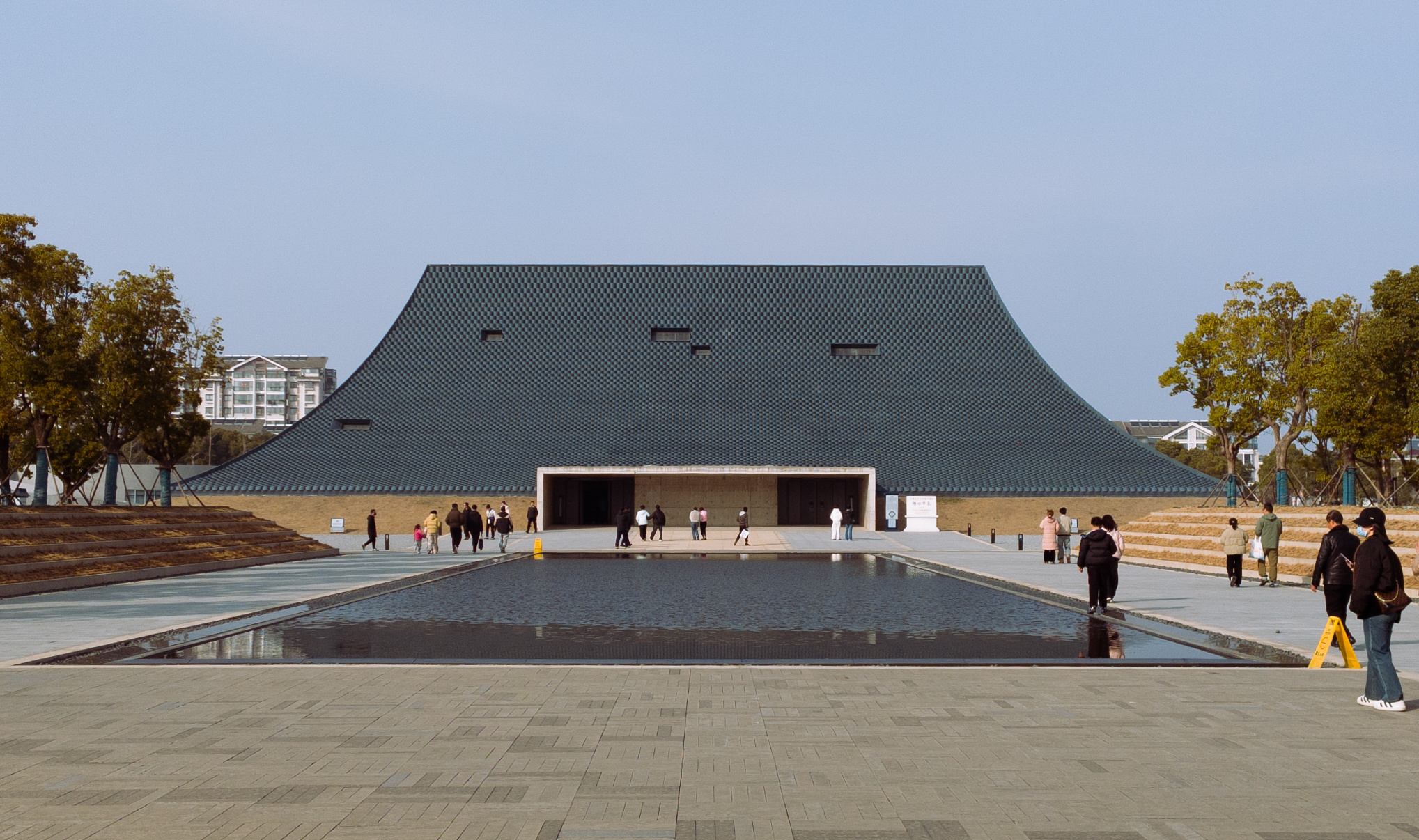
Museum of Emperor Yang of Sui over his tomb

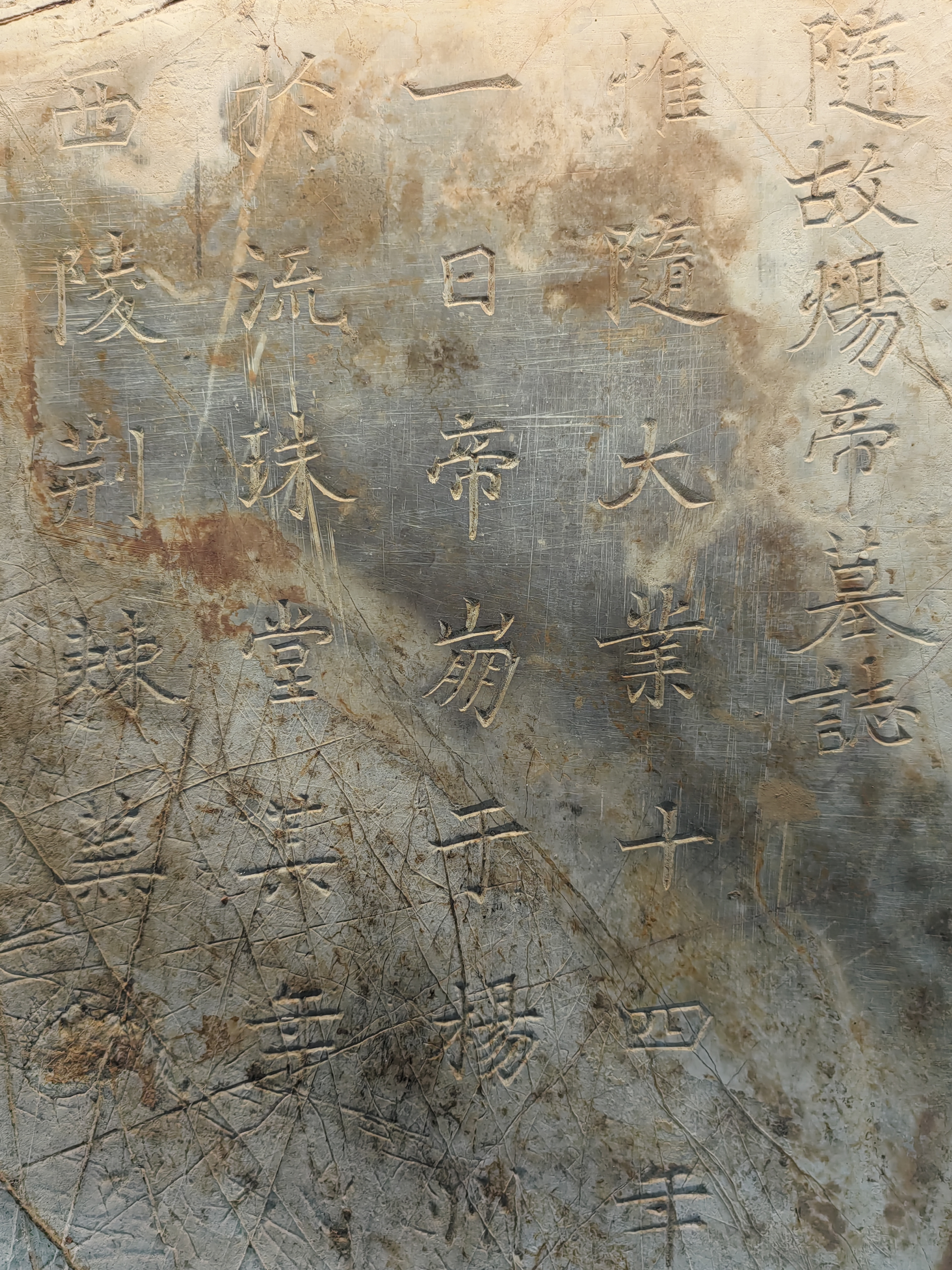
Epitaph of Yang of Sui

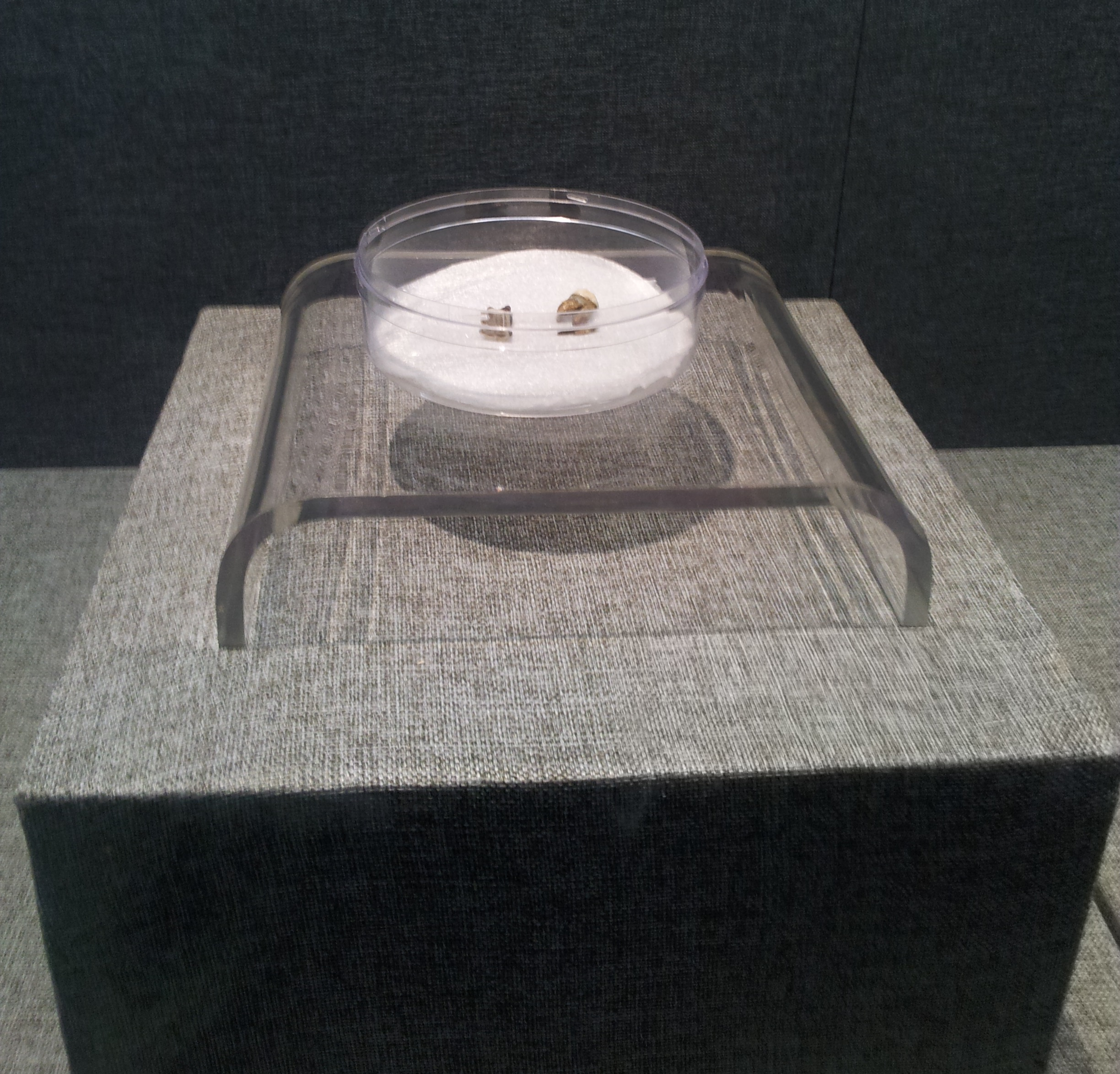
Teeth of Emperor Yang of Sui, the only relics he left

In April 2013 the tomb of Emperor Yang was discovered in Hanjiang, Yangzhou. Two brick-lined tombs were discovered in the Hanjiang District of Yangzhou during work on a housing development. A stone epitaph found in the western tomb was inscribed with the title "Tomb epitaph of the late Emperor Yang of Sui" (隋故煬帝墓誌), indicating that the tomb was that of Emperor Yang. It is thought that the other tomb may be that of the emperor's consort, but it has not yet been properly excavated.

The tomb is 4.98 × 5.88 meters in dimension, which is smaller than many non-royal tombs of the period. The reason for the tomb's small size according to Chinese archaeologists is that the emperor died suddenly when he escaped to Yangzhou during a coup, and there was no time to build a grand tomb.

The top of the tomb had been damaged by later buildings built on top of it, and the tomb had been robbed in antiquity. No coffin or human remains have been found in the tomb, but a number of artefacts have been recovered, including a pair of lion-shaped gold-inlaid iron door-knockers and a jade belt with gold decoration.

== Arts ==
Emperor Yang was also a patron of the arts, having expanded the number of foreign orchestras (from across Asia) at the Sui court from seven to nine. He was, in fact, quite a gifted artist himself, but one prone to horrible fits of jealousy and stubbornness, who seldom listened to the advice of more talented individuals. He was a talented poet but killed two poets after he found their stanzas to be superior to his own.

== In popular culture ==
- Portrayed by Lau Dan in the 1975 CTV TV series Saga of Sui and Tang Dynasty.
- Portrayed by Lawrence Ng in the 1987 TVB TV series The Grand Canal.
- Portrayed by Song Weiliang in the 1994 CCTV Opera TV series Princess Lechang.
- Portrayed by Shao Feng in the 1996 CCTV TV series Heroes in Sui and Tang Dynasties.
- Portrayed by Ben Wong in the 1996 TV series Ancient Heroes.
- Portrayed by Eddie Kwan in the 1998 Animation film Mulan.
- Portrayed by Zhou Yemang in the 2000 TV series Peach Blossoms in Troubled Times.
- Portrayed by Tse Kwan-ho in the 2003 TV series Heroes of the Sui and Tang Dynasties.
- Portrayed by Ricky Wong in the 2004 TVB TV series Twin of Brothers.
- Portrayed by Hei Zi in the 2005 TV series The Prince of Qin, Li Shimin.
- Portrayed by Bao Guo'an in the 2006 TV series Initiating Prosperity.
- Portrayed by Kim Kap-soo in the 2006-2007 SBS TV series Yeon Gaesomun.
- Portrayed by Gao Hu in the in the 2011 CCTV-1 TV series Twin of Brothers.
- Portrayed by Winston Chao in the 2012-2013 Hunan TV/Jiangsu TV TV series Heroes of Sui and Tang Dynasties.
- Portrayed by Fu Dalong in the 2013 Dragon TV/SDTV/SZMG/HEBTV/ZJTV TV series Heroes in Sui and Tang Dynasties.
- Portrayed by Ma Xin Ming in the 2019 iQIYI/Youku/Tencent TV series Queen Dugu.

== Era name ==
- Daye (大業; Dàyè) 605–618

== Family ==
=== Consorts and issue ===
- Empress Min, of the Lanling Xiao clan (愍皇后 蘭陵蕭氏; 567–647)
  - Yang Zhao, Emperor Xiaocheng (孝成皇帝 楊昭; 584–606), first son
  - Yang Jian, Prince of Qi (齊王 楊暕; 585–618), second son
  - Princess Nanyang (南陽公主; 586–630), first daughter
    - Married Yuwen Shiji, Duke Xincheng (572–642) in 599, and had issue (one son)
  - Third son
  - Princess Yang (陽氏), second daughter
    - married Li Shimin of Longxi (隴西; 598–649), and had issue (two sons including Li Ke)
- Consort, of the Yingchuan Chen clan (妃 潁川陳氏)
- Concubine, of the Xiao clan (嬪 蕭氏)
  - Yang Gao, Prince of Zhao (趙王 楊杲; 607–618), fourth son
- Noble Lady, of the Yingchuan Chen clan (贵人 潁川陳氏), personal name Chou (婤)
- Jieyu, of the Dao clan (婕妤刀氏), personal name Miaolian (妙琏)
- Lady, of the Wang clan (王氏), niece of Emperor Gaozu of Tang

=== Descendants ===
- Yang Guang, Emperor Yang of Sui
  - Yang Zhao (楊昭) (584–606)
    - Yang Dan (楊倓) (603–618), Prince of Yan (燕王), Zhao's son with Lady Liu the Elder (大刘良娣), killed under Yuwen Huaji's order
    - Lord Huangtai (皇泰主) (604–619), personal name Yang Tong (杨侗), Zhao's son with Lady Liu the Younger (小劉良娣), bestowed by Wang Shichong as Emperor Gong (恭皇帝), later killed under Wang's order
    - Emperor Gong (恭皇帝) (605–618), personal name Yang You (楊侑), Zhao's son with Consort Wei (韦妃), died after his abdication in favor of Li Yuan, Imperial Duke of Tang
  - Yang Jian (楊暕) (585–618)
    - Two elder sons, murdered by Yuwen Huaji in 618
    - Yang Zhengdao (618/619–650s), later given the office of Yuanwai sanqi shilang (员外散骑侍郎) in Tang dynasty
      - Yang Chongli (杨崇礼) (?–?), given the office of Minister of Palace Supplies (太府卿), Minister of Revenue (户部尚书)
        - Yang Shenming (杨慎名) (?–747), forced to suicide with his brothers by Emperor Xuanzong
        - Yang Shenjin (杨慎矜) (?–747), given the office of Palace Assistant Imperial Clerk (御史中丞), conspiring against other Tang officials, later forced to suicide with his brothers by Emperor Xuanzong
        - Yang Shenyu (杨慎馀) (?–747), forced to suicide with his brothers by Emperor Xuanzong
        - One daughter, married Xin Mou (辛某)
          - Xin Jingcou (辛景凑) (?–?)
    - One daughter with Lady Wei (韦氏)
  - Princess Nanyang (南陽公主) (586–630)
    - Yuwen Chanshi (宇文禅师) (?–619), son with Yuwen Shiji, executed with his uncles under Dou Jiande's order
  - Consort Yang (楊妃) (?–?)
    - Li Ke (李恪) (619–653), Prince of Wu (吴王), married Lady Yang, a daughter of Yang Yu (杨誉) and sister of Yang Chongjing (杨崇敬)
      - Li Qianli (李千里) (645/646?–708), courtesy name Ren (仁), Prince of Cheng (成王), married Murong Zhenruhai (慕容真如海) (651–726), a descendant of Northern Yan royalty
        - Li Xi (李禧) (?–?), Prince of Tianshui Commandery (天水郡王)
      - Li Wei (李玮) (647–642), posthumously promoted as Prince of Langling Commandery (朗陵郡王), married Lady Feng, great-granddaughter of Feng Ang (冯盎) the Imperial Duke of Jing (耿国公), descendant of the Nanyue people
        - Li Zuo (李祚) (?–?), Prince of Langling Commandery
        - Li Xuan (李袨) (?–?), other name Li Yu (李褕), Prince Sishu (嗣蜀王)
      - Li Kun (李琨) (?–702), Prince of Wu
        - Li Yi (李祎) (?–743), Prince of Xin'an Commandery (信安郡王), married Lady Lü (吕氏)
          - Li Huan (李峘) (?–?), Imperial Duke of Zhao (赵国公)
          - Li Yi (李峄) (?–?)
          - Li Xian (李岘) (708–766), Imperial Duke of Liang (梁国公)
        - Li Ru (李襦) (?–?), Imperial Duke of Bi (毕国公)
        - Li Duan (李褍) (?–?)
        - Li Zhi (李祗) (?–?), Prince Siwu (嗣吴王)
          - Li Hu (李岵) (?–?)
          - Li Yan (李巘) (?–?), Prince Siwu
            - Li Zhou (李宙) (?–?), Prince Siwu
        - Li Gui (李袿) (?–?)
      - Li Jing (李璄) (?–?), Prince of Guizheng Commandery (归政郡王)
        - Li Gui (李襘) (?–?)
      - Princess of Xin'an County (信安县主) (648–716), married Yuan Sizhong (元思忠), descendant of Tuoba Huang, prince of Northern Wei
        - Yuan Shouyi (元守一) (?–?)
        - Yuan Guan (元瓘) (?–?)
        - Yuan Gui (元瓌) (?–?)
      - Li Hua (李华) (650–715), Princess of Xuancheng County (宣城县主)
    - Li Yin (李愔) (620?–667), Prince of Shu (梁王)
      - Li Fan (李璠) (?–689), Prince Sishu (嗣蜀王)
      - Li Chou (李畴) (?–689), Prince of Guangdou Commandery (广都郡王)
      - Li Jin (李瑾) (?–?), Prince of Jiangling Commandery (江陵郡王)
      - Princess of Bao'an County (宝安县主) (?–?), married Cui Sigu (崔思古)
        - Cui Zikan (崔子偘) (?–?), chariot servant (辇郎) of Gaozong
  - (?) Princess Huainan (淮南公主) (?–?)
    - Ashina Heluogu (阿史那賀邏鶻) (?–?), son with Ashina Shibobi

== See also ==
- Goguryeo–Sui Wars

Regnal titles
Preceded by Emperor Wen of Sui	Emperor of China; Sui; 604–618	Vacant Title next held by Emperor Gaozu of Tang
