= Yue Prefecture (Hunan) =

Prefecture in imperial China

- Simplified Chinese: 岳州
- Hanyu Pinyin: Yuè Zhōu
- Population
  - 740s or 750s: 50,298
  - 1100s: 128,450
- History
  - Preceded by: Baling Commandery
  - Created: 589 (Sui dynasty); 623 (Tang dynasty); 758 (Tang dynasty); 1161 (Song dynasty); 1376 (Ming dynasty)
  - Kingdom: Chu (907–951)

Yuezhou or Yue Prefecture was a zhou (prefecture) in imperial China in modern Hunan, China, centering on modern Yueyang.

== Counties ==
Yue Prefecture administered the following counties (縣) through history:

| # | Sui dynasty | Tang dynasty | Chu | Song dynasty | Modern location |
|---|---|---|---|---|---|
| 1 | Baling (巴陵) | | | | Yueyang |
| 2 | Huarong (華容) | | | | Huarong County |
| 3 | | Changjiang (昌江) | Pingjiang (平江) | | Pingjiang County |
| 4 | | | | Wangchao (王朝), 994–996; Linxiang (臨湘), after 996 | Linxiang, Hunan |
| 5 | Xiangyin (湘陰) | | | | Xiangyin County |
| 6 | Yuanjiang (沅江) | Yuanjiang, 618–750s; Qiaojiang (橋江), 750s–907 | Qiaojiang | | Yuanjiang |
