= Shibi Qaghan =

- Second Khagan of the Eastern Turkic Khaganate
- Reign: 609–c. April 619
- Predecessor: Yami Qaghan
- Successor: Chuluo Qaghan
- Born: Ashina Duoji(shi) 阿史那咄吉(世)
- Died: c. April 619; Taiyuan
- Spouse: Princess Yicheng (義成公主)
- Issue: Ashina Shibobi; Ashina Jiesheshuai
- House: Ashina
- Father: Yami Qaghan
- Religion: Tengrism

Shibi Qaghan
- Traditional Chinese: 始畢可汗
- Simplified Chinese: 始毕可汗
Transcriptions
Standard Mandarin
- Hanyu Pinyin: Shǐbì Kěhàn
- Wade–Giles: Shih-pi K‘o-han
Middle Chinese
- Middle Chinese: [[ɕi̯ə˥pi̯et kʰɑ˥ɣɑn˩˥]] Error: {{Transliteration}}: transliteration text not Latin script (pos 67: ̯) (help)

Ashina Duojishi
- Chinese: 阿史那咄吉世
Transcriptions
Standard Mandarin
- Hanyu Pinyin: Āshǐnà Duōjíshì
- Wade–Giles: A-shih-na To-chi-shih

Shibi Qaghan (r. 609 or 611 – c. April 619) succeeded Yami Qaghan as the khagan of the Eastern Turkic Khaganate.

== Reign ==
Shibi Qaghan succeeded Yami Qaghan in 609 or 611. From 613 to 615 he was actively supporting agrarian rebels inside China.

The Chinese politician Pei Ju thought that Shibi was becoming strong and difficult to control and therefore suggested that Emperor Yang offer to marry a princess to his brother, Ashina Chiji (阿史那叱吉). Chiji, in fear, declined. Later, Pei, tricked his Shibi's strategist Shishuhu (史蜀胡) into meeting him at Mayi (present-day Shuozhou, Shanxi) and then killed him, claiming that Shishuhu was planning to rebel against Shibi. Shibi, knowing that the accusation was false, became resolved to rebel against the Sui.

In the fall of 615, when Emperor Yang was visiting Yanmen Commandery on the northern frontier, Shibi launched a surprise attack on the area, overrunning most of its Chinese settlements. Warned by Shibi's wife Princess Yicheng — a member of the imperial family who had been well treated by Empress Xiao during an earlier visit — the Emperor, Empress, and their entourage escaped to the commandery seat at present-day Daixian. The Göktürks besieged them there on September 11. The seat had few resources. The Emperor was reported to cry out of fear, seeing this, Yuwen suggested that Emperor Yang select a few thousand elite cavalry soldiers to attempt a break out, but Su Wei and Fan Zigai (樊子蓋) persuaded him not to attempt this. Emperor Yang put Xiao Yu and Pei Ju in charge of planning the military counteroffensive, but was only able to get the siege lifted after he followed the advice of the Empress's brother Xiao Yu and sent messengers to Princess Yicheng, who was directing military affairs at the Turkic capital in Shibi's absence. She falsely informed Shibi that they were under attack from the north, and so Shibi lifted the siege.

During the turmoil of the later years of Emperor Yang's reign, he supported various local warlords in northwestern China, who claimed the title of emperor, including Li Yuan, who would go on to found the Tang dynasty. The Shibi supplied Li with 2,000 horses and 500 cavalry, and played a crucial role in the early victories of the Tang such as the Battle of Huoyi.

Shibi khagan later supported Liang Shidu and made him Tardu Bilge khagan (大度毗伽可汗) and bestowed on him a flag with a wolf head, the symbol of the Tujue. Liang guided Shibi's forces to occupy the Ordos Desert region. Subsequently, Shibi made him Jieshi Tianzi (解事天子, i.e., "the Tianzi who solved issues"), although he himself declared a state of Liang and himself its emperor. His ally Guo Zihe was also made Wuli shad.

He also supported Liu Wuzhou, who gathered about 10,000 soldiers and declared himself commandery governor. When officials of the nearby Yanmen Commandery (roughly modern Xinzhou, Shanxi), Chen Xiaoyi (陳孝意) and Wang Zhibian (王智辯) attacked him, he struck back in conjunction with the Eastern Turkic Khaganate, killing Wang and forcing Chen to flee. He then captured Loufan Commandery (樓煩郡, part of modern Xinzhou) and pillaged Fenyang Palace (汾陽宮)—one of the numerous subsidiary palaces that Emperor Yang built around the empire—and took the ladies in waiting and gave them to Shibi as tribute; in return, Shibi sent him horses. Liu then captured Dingxiang Commandery (定襄郡, roughly modern Hohhot, Inner Mongolia). Shibi then made him "Dingyang Khagan" (the Khagan who rules over Yang) he also bestowed on Liu a great banner with a symbol of a wolf's head.

Another rebel, Li Yuan declared rebellion in the fall of 617, and Liu Wenjing suggested that he, who was still ostensibly claiming to be loyal to the Sui but wanting to support Emperor Yang's grandson Yang You, Prince of Dai, then at Chang'an, as Emperor, should change his banners from the regular Sui banners to distance himself from Emperor Yang, while seeking an alliance with the Eastern Turkic Khaganate for support. Li Yuan agreed, and sent Liu to the Eastern Turkic Khaganate to meet with Shibi Qaghan. When Shibi asked him what Li Yuan's intention was, Liu responded:

The Emperor [i.e., Emperor Yang's father Emperor Wen] deposed his proper heir [i.e., Emperor Yang's older brother Yang Yong] and gave the throne to this current emperor, and this led to the current troubles. The Duke of Tang is an honored relative of the imperial clan, and he did not dare to sit by watching for the state to fail, and therefore he rose in righteousness, wanting to depose the improper emperor. He is willing to enter the capital with the soldiers of you, Great Khagan. If you do so, the people and the land will belong to the Duke of Tang, but the money, silk, gold, and treasures will be yours, Great Khagan.

Shibi was pleased, and while he was not wholeheartedly willing to support Li Yuan, he nevertheless sent his general Kangqiaoli (康鞘利) Tegin with 2,000 men to accompany Liu back south, as Li Yuan had already marched south toward Chang'an, and he also gave Li Yuan 1,000 horses. Li Yuan, who wanted Turkic horses more than Turkic soldiers, was pleased and praised Liu for his skills at diplomacy. Shibi's brother Ashina Chiji (阿史那叱吉) was appointed to accompany the Tang army to Changan.

Commander of Wuyuan county Zhang Cangxun (张长逊) submitted to Shibi Qaghan in 618 and was made Koli Tegin.

In the spring of 618, Shibi Qaghan sent his ambassador Kutlug Tegin (骨咄禄特勤) to the Tang.

In February 619, Shibi Qaghan was planning to launch a major incursion into Chinese territory and he had Liu Wuzhou to join him. After passing into Xia territory, Liang Shidu also joined him. However, he soon died whilst campaigning near Taiyuan.

== Family ==
Shibi Qaghan was the father of Ashina Shibobi (阿史那什钵苾) and Ashina Jiesheshuai.

Shibi Qaghan Ashina Clan
Preceded by Yami Qaghan	Khagan of the Eastern Turkic Khaganate; 611–619	Succeeded by Chulo Qaghan
