= Dingxiang Commandery =

Historical political subdivision in China

Dingxiang Commandery (Chinese: 定襄郡) was a historical commandery of China. It was located in the southern part of modern Hohhot and Ulanqab prefectures in Inner Mongolia.

The commandery was separated from Yunzhong during Emperor Gaozu of Han's reign. In late Western Han dynasty, it administered 12 counties, namely Chengle (成樂), Tongguo (桐過), Duwu (都武), Wujin (武進), Xiangyin (襄陰), Wugao (武皋), Luo (駱), Antao (安陶), Wucheng (武成), Wuyao (武要), Dingxiang (定襄) and Fulu (復陸). The population was 163,144 in 38,559 households in 2 AD.

The commandery was briefly abandoned from 34 to 50 AD due to Xiongnu invasions. In 50 AD, the Southern Xiongnu submitted to Han control, and the commandery was partly restored to resettle former residents and the Xiongnu. 6 northern counties were abolished, and later 3 more were transferred to Yunzhong Commandery, while Shanwu (善無) and Zhongling (中陵) counties were added from Yanmen Commandery. In 140 AD, Dingxiang had 5 counties: Shanwu, Luo, Tongguo, Wucheng and Zhongling. The population was 3,571, in 3,153 households. Toward the end Han dynasty, the area's population decreased sharply as residents fled from invading northern nomadic peoples, and the commandery was dissolved.

In the Sui and Tang dynasties, the name Dingxiang Commandery was revived to refer to Yun (雲) and Xin (忻) prefectures, respectively. Yun Prefecture in Sui dynasty administered only 1 county, Dali (大利), and 374 households, while Xin Prefecture in Tang dynasty administered 2 counties, Xiurong (秀容) and Dingxiang (定襄, in a different location from the synonymous county of Han dynasty). The population was 14,806 households or 82,032 individuals in 741 AD.
