= Princess Xiangcheng =

Tang dynasty princess (died 651)

- Died: 651; Chang'an, Tang China
- Burial: Zhao Mausoleum, Shaanxi
- Spouse: Xiao Rui
- Issue: Xiao Shougui; Xiao Shoudao; Lady Xiao
- Father: Emperor Taizong of Tang

Princess Xiangcheng (? – 651; personal name unknown), was a princess of the Tang dynasty of China as the eldest daughter of Emperor Taizong.

She married Xiao Rui, son of Xiao Yu, one of the twenty-four meritorious officials commemorated in the Lingyan Pavilion.

== Early life ==
Princess Xiangcheng is speculated to be born in 621 in Chang'an; the identity of her birth mother is unknown.

The princess was renowned for her filial piety and kindness, and her actions consistently reflected proper rituals. Emperor Taizong frequently issued edicts urging the other princesses to regard Princess Xiangcheng as a role model.

== Married life ==
According to custom, a princess was not allowed to live in her husband's household after marriage; instead, a new residence—a princess's mansion—was to be constructed for her. However, Princess Xiangcheng rejected this arrangement, stating, "A daughter-in-law should treat her parents-in-law as her own parents, serving them both morning and evening. If we do not live together, the customary duty of attending to them at designated times will be compromised." Consequently, instead of building a new residence, the authorities simply renovated Xiao Yu's mansion on Kaihua Lane, adorning its entrance with paired halberds to meet the standards required for a princess's residence.

Princess Xiangcheng was the mother of three children: two sons, Xiao Shougui and Xiao Shoudao, and a daughter, Lady Xiao.

== Death and burial ==
In 651, while Xiao Rui was serving as the Inspector of Hengzhou, Princess Xiangcheng died in Hengzhou. In response, Emperor Gaozong ordered that all the imperial consorts mourn her in the court hall, and dispatched Qiu Xingyan, an official from the Ministry of Works, to offer special mourning rites. He also decreed that she be interred in Zhao Mausoleum. As her coffin passed through the western section of the old city of Chang’an, Emperor Gaozong ascended a tower to bid her farewell, weeping.

After Xiao Rui's death, he was interred together with Princess Xiangcheng in a joint burial.
