= Princess Changle (Tang dynasty) =

Chinese princess (621–643)

Princess Changle 長樂公主
- Born: 621
- Died: 28 September 643 (aged 21–22)
- Burial: Zhao Mausoleum, Shaanxi
- Spouse: Zhangsun Chong
- Issue: Zhangsun Yan
- House: Li
- Father: Emperor Taizong of Tang
- Mother: Empress Zhangsun

Princess Changle (Chinese: 長樂公主; 621 – 28 September 643), personal name Li Lizhi (李麗質) was a princess of the Tang dynasty. She was the fifth daughter of Emperor Taizong and the eldest daughter of Empress Zhangsun.

== Biography ==
According to her epitaphs, Li Lizhi was intelligent and had a bright personality and beautiful appearance. She was especially favoured by her parents, Taizong and Empress Zhangsun. Li Lizhi was also a painter.

At the age of 8, Li Lizhi got the princess title. Li Lizhi married her cousin Zhangsun Chong, the son of Zhangsun Wuji in 633.

Emperor Taizong wanted his daughter's marriage to have a high dowry, and the chancellor Fang Xuanling suggested him that her dowry could be doubled, compared with Taizong's sister, Princess Yongjia. However, Taizong did not do that because Wei Zheng commented that this would violate Confucian ethics. Empress Zhangsun bestowed Wei Zheng for his justice.

Li Lizhi had a son, Zhangsun Yan. By 639, Emperor Taizong wanted to establish the key contributors to his reign, including Zhangsun Wuji, posts as governors to be passed to their descendants. There was much objection to this plan, including from Zhangsun Wuji, who sent Princess Changle to remonstrate to her father. Upon hearing his daughter's remonstrance, Emperor Taizong gave up the plan.

== Death ==
Li Lizhi died on 28 September 643, likely due to a genetic condition that affected many other members of her family. Taizong was very aggrieved because of her death at a young age. She was buried in Zhao Mausoleum beside her parents.

== Tomb ==
Li Lizhi's tomb is just beside Zhao Mausoleum. It was opened in 1991. In her tomb, there are murals on the walls, and pottery tomb figures.

The most famous mural in the tomb is a painting of cart and house in the cloud. The murals illustrated the technique of painting during the Tang dynasty.
