= Emperor Taizong of Tang =

Emperor of China from 626 to 649

- Emperor Taizong Receiving the Tibetan Envoy, by Tang dynasty painter Yan Liben

Emperor of the Tang dynasty
- Reign: 4 September 626 (Note: The Zizhi Tongjian recorded that Taizong assumed the throne on the jiazi day of the eighth month of the ninth year of the Wude era of Tang Gaozu's reign. This date corresponds to 4 Sep 626 on the Gregorian calendar. While Gaozu's and Taizong's biographies in New Book of Tang recorded the same coronation date as Tongjian, their biographies in Old Book of Tang recorded the coronation date as the guihai day of the same month and year, i.e. the day before (3 Sep 626). Tongjian recorded that on that day, Gaozu attempted to cede the throne to Taizong; the latter declined to accept.) – 10 July 649
- Predecessor: Emperor Gaozu
- Successor: Emperor Gaozong
- Born: 28 January 598; Qingshan Palace, Wugong, Sui China
- Died: 10 July 649 (aged 51); Cuiwei Palace, Chang'an
- Burial: Zhao Mausoleum
- Consorts: Empress Wende (m. 613; died 636)
Names
- Family name: Li (李); Given name: Shimin (世民)
Era name and dates
- Zhenguan (貞觀): 4 September 626 – 10 July 649
Posthumous name
- Short: Emperor Wen (文皇帝); Full: Emperor Wen Wu Dasheng Daguang Xiao (Note: Given in final version as of 754.) (文武大聖大廣孝皇帝 (Note: []))
Temple name
- Taizong (太宗)
- House: Li
- Dynasty: Tang
- Father: Emperor Gaozu
- Mother: Empress Taimu

Chinese name
- Chinese: 唐太宗
- Literal meaning: "Great Ancestor of the Tang"
Transcriptions
Standard Mandarin
- Hanyu Pinyin: Táng Tàizōng
- Wade–Giles: T'ang^{2} T'ai^{4}-tsung^{1}
- IPA: [tʰǎŋ tʰâɪ.tsʊ́ŋ]
Yue: Cantonese
- Yale Romanization: Tòhng Taaijūng
- Jyutping: tong4 taai3 zung1
- IPA: [tʰɔŋ˩ tʰaj˧tsʊŋ˥]

Qin Wang
- Chinese: 秦王
- Literal meaning: King of Qin
Transcriptions
Standard Mandarin
- Hanyu Pinyin: Qín Wáng
Yue: Cantonese
- Yale Romanization: Chèuhn Wohng

Li Shimin
- Chinese: 李世民
Transcriptions
Standard Mandarin
- Hanyu Pinyin: Lǐ Shìmín
- IPA: [lì ʂɨ̂.mǐn]
Yue: Cantonese
- Yale Romanization: Léih Saimàhn

Emperor Taizong of Tang (28 January 598 – 10 July 649), previously Prince of Qin, personal name Li Shimin, was the second emperor of the Tang dynasty of China from 626 until his death in 649. He is traditionally regarded as a co-founder of the dynasty for his role in encouraging his father Li Yuan (Emperor Gaozu) to rebel against the Sui dynasty at Jinyang in 617. Taizong subsequently played a pivotal role in defeating several of the dynasty's most dangerous opponents and solidifying its rule over China proper. (Note: His status as co-founder on par with Gaozu appeared certain by the time of the Southern Tang, which claimed inheritance of Tang heritage; its founding emperor Emperor Liezu (Li Bian) recognized that status by treating Emperors Gaozu and Taizong, as well as his adoptive father Xu Wen, all as founders of his state.)

Taizong is considered to be one of the greatest emperors in China's history, and henceforth his reign became regarded as the exemplary model by which all future emperors were measured. His era, the "Reign of Zhenguan" (Chinese: 貞觀之治; pinyin: Zhēnguàn Zhī Zhì) is considered a golden age in ancient Chinese history and was treated as required studying material for future crown princes. Taizong continued to develop imperial examination systems. He asked his officials to be loyal to policies, not people, in order to eliminate corruption. Under the Zhenguan era, Tang China flourished economically and militarily. For more than a century after his death, China enjoyed prosperity and peace brought about by the solidification of imperial protection over the Chinese regions. In territorial extent, it covered most of the territories previously held by the Han dynasty as well as parts of modern-day Korea, Vietnam, Russia, Mongolia, Xinjiang, and Central Asia. This era of consolidation and conquest laid the foundation for Xuanzong's reign, which is considered to be the height of the Tang dynasty.

In 630, Emperor Taizong sent his general Li Jing against the Eastern Turks, defeating and capturing their Jiali Khan Ashina Duobi and destroying their power. This made Tang the dominant power in East and Central Asia, and Emperor Taizong subsequently took the title Khan of Heaven. He also launched a series of campaigns against the oasis states of the Tarim Basin, and against their main ally, the Western Turks. During his reign, Tang armies annexed Karakhoja in 640, Karasahr in 644, and Kucha in 648. Eventually, the Tang defeated and annexed the Western Turkic Khaganate after Su Dingfang defeated Qaghan Ashina Helu in 657.

Unlike much of the nobility in his time, Emperor Taizong was a frank rationalist and scholar of logic and scientific reason, openly scorning superstitions and claims of signs from the heavens. He also modified important rites in order to ease the burden of agricultural labour. The modern Chinese historian Bo Yang opined that Emperor Taizong achieved greatness by enduring criticism which others would find difficult to accept whilst trying hard not to abuse his absolute power (using Emperor Yang of Sui as a negative example), as well as by employing capable chancellors such as Fang Xuanling, Du Ruhui, and Wei Zheng. Emperor Taizong's wife Empress Zhangsun also proved to be a capable assistant.

== Early life ==
Li Shimin was born in 598 at Wugong, in modern Xianyang, Shaanxi. His father Li Yuan, the duke of Tang, was a general of the Sui dynasty, and a nephew, by marriage, to Sui's founding emperor Emperor Wen. Li Shimin's grandmother Duchess Dugu was a sister of Empress Dugu, both of whom were daughters of Dugu Xin, a major Xianbei general during Sui's predecessor dynasty Northern Zhou. Li Shimin's mother, Li Yuan's wife Duchess Dou, was a daughter of Dou Yi (竇毅), the Duke of Shenwu, and his wife, Northern Zhou's Princess Xiangyang. Li Shimin was also of partial Xianbei descent. Duchess Dou bore Li Yuan four sons—an older brother to Li Shimin, Li Jiancheng, and two younger brothers, Li Yuanba (李元霸), who would die in 614, and Li Yuanji – and at least one daughter (the later Princess Pingyang). Li Yuan named Li Shimin "Shimin" as a shortened form of the phrase "save the earth and pacify the people" (濟世安民; jìshì ānmín). Li Shimin apparently showed talent early in his life, and in 613, the official Gao Shilian, impressed with him, gave him a niece (the later Empress Zhangsun) in marriage as his wife; he was 14 and she was 12. In 615, when Emperor Wen's son and successor Emperor Yang was ambushed by Eastern Turkic (Dongtujue) forces under Shibi Khan at Yanmen Commandery (present-day Daixian in Shanxi), a general call was made for men to join the army to help rescue the emperor. Li Shimin answered that call and served under the general Yun Dingxing (雲定興), apparently doing so with distinction. In 616, when Li Yuan was put in charge of the important city of Taiyuan, he brought Li Shimin with him to Taiyuan, while leaving at least three other sons – Li Jiancheng, Li Yuanji, and Li Zhiyun (李智雲, by Li Yuan's concubine Lady Wan) – at the ancestral home Hedong (河東, in modern Yuncheng, Shanxi).

== Participation in the rebellion against Sui rule ==
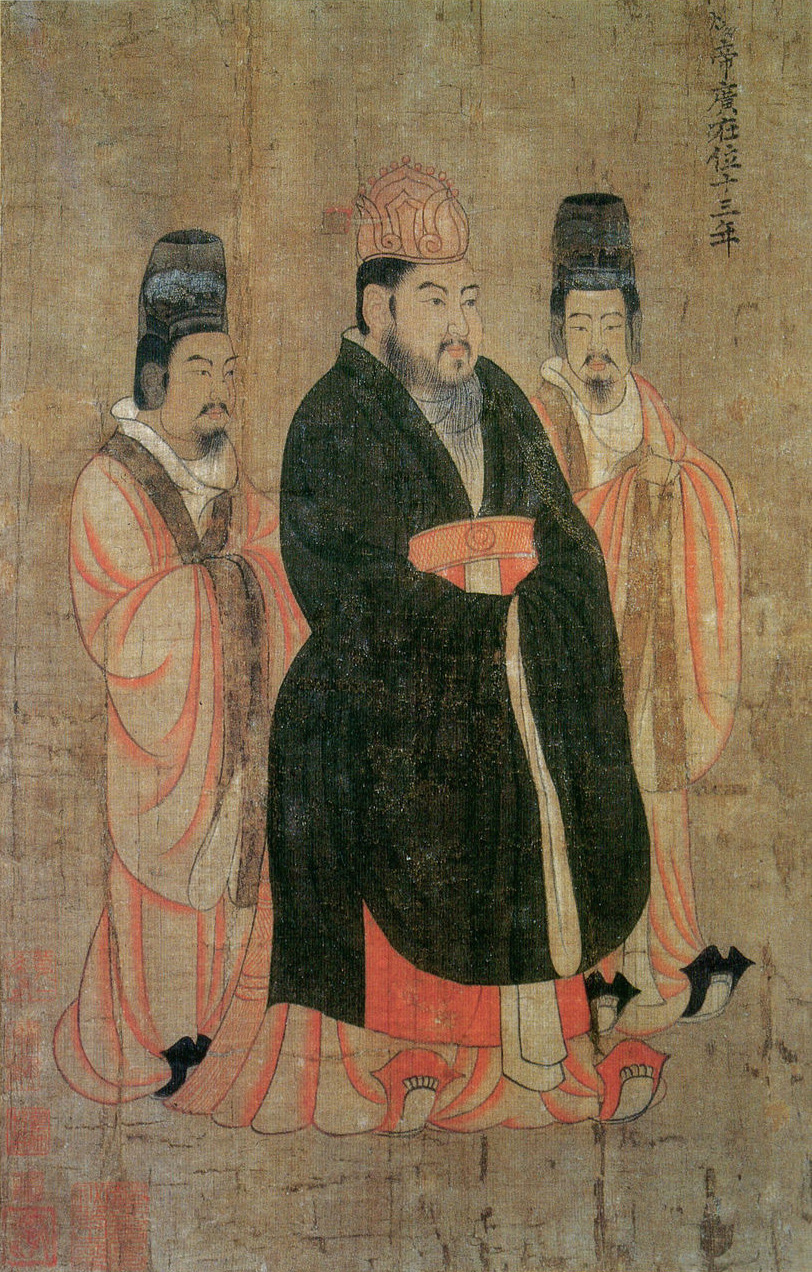
A portrait of Emperor Yang of Sui, by the Tang court artist Yan Liben (600–673)

Emperor Yang was soon dissatisfied with Li Yuan and Wang Rengong (王仁恭), the governor of Mayi Commandery (馬邑, roughly modern Shuozhou, Shanxi), over their inability to stop Eastern Turkic incursions and the growing strength of agrarian rebels, particularly the Eastern Turkic-supported Liu Wuzhou, who soon rose against Wang, killed him, and captured Emperor Yang's secondary palace near Taiyuan. Li Yuan also became fearful of a prophecy that the next emperor would be named Li—Emperor Yang had previously killed another official, Li Hun (李渾), and Li Hun's clan over his fear that Li Hun's nephew, Li Min (李敏), would seize the throne.

Fearful for his life, Li Yuan considered rebellion. However, he did not know that Li Shimin had also been secretly discussing plans for rebellion with Li Yuan's associates Pei Ji and Liu Wenjing. Once Li Shimin's plans matured, he had Pei inform Li Yuan of them—and also had Pei warn Li Yuan that if it were revealed that Li Yuan had had sexual relations with some of Emperor Yang's ladies in waiting at the secondary Jinyang Palace (晉陽宮, which Pei was in charge of and had allowed Li Yuan to do so), all of them would be slaughtered. (Note: In his Zizhi Tongjian Kaoyi, Sima Guang also expressed his skepticism of the account recorded in Da Tang Chuangye Qijuzhu, that Li Shimin had a major role in instigating his father's rebellion. He pointed out that if Emperor Yang did have an edict to execute Wang Rengong, Li Yuan would have been imprisoned as well; this would mean that it would be almost impossible for Li Yuan to rebel. Hence, Sima did not include this account in Zizhi Tongjian.) Li Yuan agreed to rebel, and after secretly summoning Li Jiancheng and Li Yuanji from Hedong and his son-in-law Chai Shao (柴紹) from the capital Chang'an, he declared a rebellion, claiming to want to support Emperor Yang's grandson Yang You the Prince of Dai, nominally in charge at Chang'an with Emperor Yang at Jiangdu (江都, in modern Yangzhou, Jiangsu), as emperor. He made both Li Jiancheng and Li Shimin major generals and advanced southwest, toward Chang'an. He gave Li Shimin the title of Duke of Dunhuang. After defeating local Sui forces loyal to Emperor Yang, he defeated a Sui army of 30,000 men under the command of a veteran general of the wars in Korea outside of modern-day Beijing.

However, when Li Yuan arrived near Hedong, his army was bogged down by the weather. With food running out, there were rumors that the Eastern Turks and Liu Wuzhou would attack Taiyuan. Li Yuan initially ordered retreat, but at the earnest opposition by Li Jiancheng and Li Shimin, continued to advance. After defeating Sui forces at Huoyi (霍邑, also in modern Yuncheng), he decided to leave a small contingent to watch over Hedong while advancing across the Yellow River into Guanzhong (i.e., the Chang'an region). Once he did, he headed for Chang'an himself, while sending Li Jiancheng to capture the territory around the Tong Pass region to prevent Sui forces at Luoyang from reinforcing Chang'an and Li Shimin north of the Wei River to capture territory there. Meanwhile, Li Shimin's sister Pingyang had also risen in rebellion in support of him, and she was able to gather a sizeable army and capture some cities. She joined forces with Li Shimin and her husband Chai Shao. Soon, Li Yuan reconsolidated his forces and put Chang'an under siege. In winter 617, after defeating a large Sui army, he captured Chang'an from imperial forces and declared Yang You emperor (as Emperor Gong). He had himself made regent (with the title of grand chancellor), Li Shimin made the Duke of Qin, and created the Prince of Tang. Meanwhile, most of the Sui territories and armies did not recognize Emperor Gong as emperor, continuing to support the former Emperor Yang.

Li Yuan's control of the Chang'an region became almost immediately contested by the rebel ruler Xue Ju, the Emperor of Qin, who sent his son Xue Rengao toward Chang'an. Li Yuan sent Li Shimin to resist Xue Rengao, and Li Shimin defeated Xue Rengao at Fufeng (in modern Baoji, Shaanxi), temporarily causing Xue Ju to toy with the idea of surrendering to Li Yuan, although Xue was subsequently dissuaded by his strategist Hao Yuan (郝瑗) from doing so.

In spring 618, with Sui's eastern capital Luoyang (where the officials in charge did not recognize Li Yuan's authorities) under attack by the rebel ruler Li Mi the Duke of Wei, Li Yuan sent Li Jiancheng and Li Shimin to Luoyang, ostensibly to aid the Sui forces at Luoyang but instead intending to test whether Luoyang might submit to him. The officials at Luoyang rebuffed his attempt at rapprochement, and Li Jiancheng and Li Shimin, not wanting to fight either them or Li Mi for control of Luoyang at this stage, withdrew. Li Yuan subsequently changed Li Shimin's title to Duke of Zhao.

In summer 618, when news arrived at Chang'an that Emperor Yang had been killed at Jiangdu in a coup led by the general Yuwen Huaji, Li Yuan had Emperor Gong yield the throne to him, establishing Tang dynasty as its Emperor Gaozu. He created Li Jiancheng crown prince but created Li Shimin the Prince of Qin, also making him Shangshu Ling (尚書令), the head of the executive bureau of the government (尚書省; Shàngshū Shěng) and a post considered one for a chancellor, while continuing to have Li Shimin serve as a major general as well.

== During Emperor Gaozu's reign ==
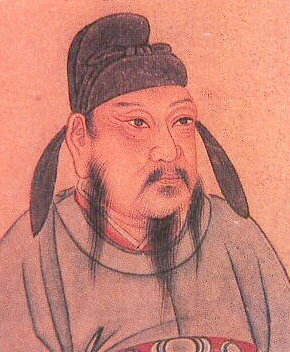
Portrait painting of Emperor Gaozu of Tang, father of Li Shimin

=== Campaign to reunify the empire ===
The first thing that Li Shimin had to deal with was another incursion by Xue Ju, as Xue attacked Jing Prefecture (涇州, roughly modern Pingliang, Gansu) and Emperor Gaozu sent Li Shimin to resist Xue. Li Shimin established his defenses and refused to engage Xue to try to wear Xue Ju out, but at that time, he was afflicted with malaria, and he let his assistants Liu Wenjing and Yin Kaishan (殷開山) take command, ordering them not to engage Xue Ju. Liu and Yin, however, did not take Xue Ju seriously, and Xue Ju ambushed them at Qianshui Plain (淺水原, in modern Xianyang), crushing Tang forces and inflicting 50–60% casualties. Li Shimin was forced to withdraw back to Chang'an, and Liu and Yin were removed from their posts. (This would be Li Shimin's only defeat recorded in historical records until the Goguryeo campaign of 645.) Xue Ju, in light of his victory, was ready to launch an assault on Chang'an itself, under Hao Yuan's advice, but suddenly died of an illness in fall 618 and was succeeded by Xue Rengao. Emperor Gaozu then sent Li Shimin against Xue Rengao. Three months after Xue Rengao took the throne, Li Shimin engaged him, and after a fierce battle between Li Shimin and Xue Rengao's major general Zong Luohou (宗羅睺), Li Shimin crushed Zong's forces and then attacked Xue Rengao. Xue Rengao was forced to withdraw into the city of Gaozhi (高墌, in modern Xianyang as well), and once he did, his soldiers began surrendering to Li Shimin en masse. Xue Rengao was himself forced to surrender. Li Shimin had him delivered to Chang'an, where he was executed. Around new year 619, Emperor Gaozu made Li Shimin Taiwei (太尉, one of the Three Excellencies) and put him in charge of Tang operations east of the Tong Pass.

In spring 619, Liu Wuzhou launched a major offensive against Tang. He captured Taiyuan in summer 619, forcing Li Yuanji, who had been in charge there, to flee, and then continued his offensive south. Emperor Gaozu sent Pei Ji against him, but by winter 619, Liu had crushed Pei's forces and taken over nearly all of modern Shanxi. Emperor Gaozu, shocked at the development, considered abandoning the region altogether. Li Shimin opposed doing so and offered to lead the army against Liu. Emperor Gaozu agreed and commissioned him with an army. He crossed the Yellow River and approached Liu's major general Song Jingang (宋金剛) but did not engage him, choosing to try to wear Song out, only having his subordinates Yin Kaishan and Qin Shubao engage the other Dingyang generals Yuchi Jingde and Xun Xiang (尋相) in relatively low-level engagements. Eventually, in spring 620, when Liu and Song ran out of food supplies, they retreated, and Li Shimin gave chase, dealing Song a major defeat. Yuchi and Xun surrendered, and after Li Shimin chased further, both Liu and Song fled to the Eastern Turks. All of Dingyang territory fell into Tang hands.

In summer 620, Emperor Gaozu again commissioned Li Shimin against a major enemy—the former Sui general Wang Shichong, who had Sui's last emperor, Emperor Yang's grandson Yang Tong, yield the throne to him in 619, establishing a new state of Zheng as its emperor. When Li Shimin arrived at the Zheng capital Luoyang, Wang offered peace, but Li Shimin rebuffed him and put Luoyang under siege. Meanwhile, his subordinates took Zheng cities one by one. By winter 620, most of Zheng territory, other than Luoyang and Xiangyang, defended by Wang Shichong's nephew Wang Honglie (王弘烈), had submitted to Tang. Wang sought aid from Dou Jiande the Prince of Xia, who controlled most of modern Hebei. Dou, reasoning that if Tang were able to destroy Zheng, his own Xia state would be next, agreed. He sent his official Li Dashi to try to persuade Li Shimin to withdraw, but Li Shimin detained Li Dashi and gave no response. Meanwhile, during the campaign, Li Shimin chose some 1,000 elite soldiers (玄甲軍), clad in black uniform and black armor, commanded by himself, to serve as advance troops, with Qin Shubao, Yuchi Jingde, Cheng Zhijie (程知節), and Zhai Zhangsun (翟長孫) as his assistants.

By spring 621, Luoyang was in desperate situation, and Xia forces had not yet arrived, but Tang troops had also suffered serious casualties, as Luoyang's defenses, aided by powerful bows and catapults, were holding. Emperor Gaozu, hearing that Dou had decided to come to Wang's aid, ordered Li Shimin to withdraw, but Li Shimin sent his secretary Feng Deyi to Chang'an to explain to Emperor Gaozu that if he did withdraw, Wang would recover and again be a major threat in the future. Emperor Gaozu agreed and allowed Li Shimin to continue to siege Luoyang. When Xia forward troops arrived first, Li Shimin surprised and defeated them, and then sent Dou a letter suggesting that he withdraw. Dou would not do so, and, against the advice of his wife Empress Cao and secretary general Ling Jing (凌敬) that he should instead attack Tang's prefectures in modern southern Shanxi, he marched toward Luoyang. Anticipating Dou's maneuver, Li Shimin left a small detachment, commanded by Li Yuanji, at Luoyang, while marching east himself, taking up position at the strategic Hulao Pass. When the armies engaged at Hulao, Li Shimin defeated Dou and captured him. He took Dou back to Luoyang and displayed him to Wang Shichong. Wang, in fear, considered abandoning Luoyang and fleeing south to Xiangyang, but as his generals pointed out that his only hope was Dou, he surrendered. Xia forces, after initially fleeing back to their capital Mingzhou (now Guangfu, Hebei), also surrendered. Zheng and Xia territory were Tang's. Li Shimin returned to Chang'an in a grand victory procession and, to reward Li Shimin, Emperor Gaozu awarded both him and Li Yuanji three mints so that they could mint money of their own. He also bestowed on Li Shimin the special title of "Grand General of Heavenly Strategies" (天策上將; tiāncè shàngjiàng). Meanwhile, Li Shimin's staff, already full of generals and strategists, were supplemented with a number of literary men.

The former Xia territory did not remain in Tang hands for long. In the winter of 621, the Xia general Liu Heita rose against Tang rule, claiming to be avenging Dou, whom Emperor Gaozu had executed against Li Shimin's wishes after he had been brought back to Chang'an. Liu was allied with Xu Yuanlang, a former agrarian rebel general who was nominally under Wang Shichong and who had submitted to Tang after Wang's defeat. Liu dealt successive defeats to Emperor Gaozu's cousin Li Shentong (李神通), the Prince of Huai'an; Li Xiaochang (李孝常), the Prince of Yi'an; and Li Shiji. By the end, he had recovered almost all of the former Xia territory, established his capital at Mingzhou, and proclaimed himself the Prince of Handong. Emperor Gaozu finally sent Li Shimin and Li Yuanji against him in 622 and, after some indecisive battles, Li Shimin defeated him by first erecting a dam across the Ming River and then destroying it, with the resultant flood destroying the rebel army. Liu fled to the Eastern Turks, while Li Shimin then headed east and defeated Xu. After leaving Li Shiji, Li Shentong, and Ren Gui (任瓌) to continue attacking Xu, Li Shimin returned to Chang'an.

=== Struggle against Li Jiancheng and Li Yuanji ===
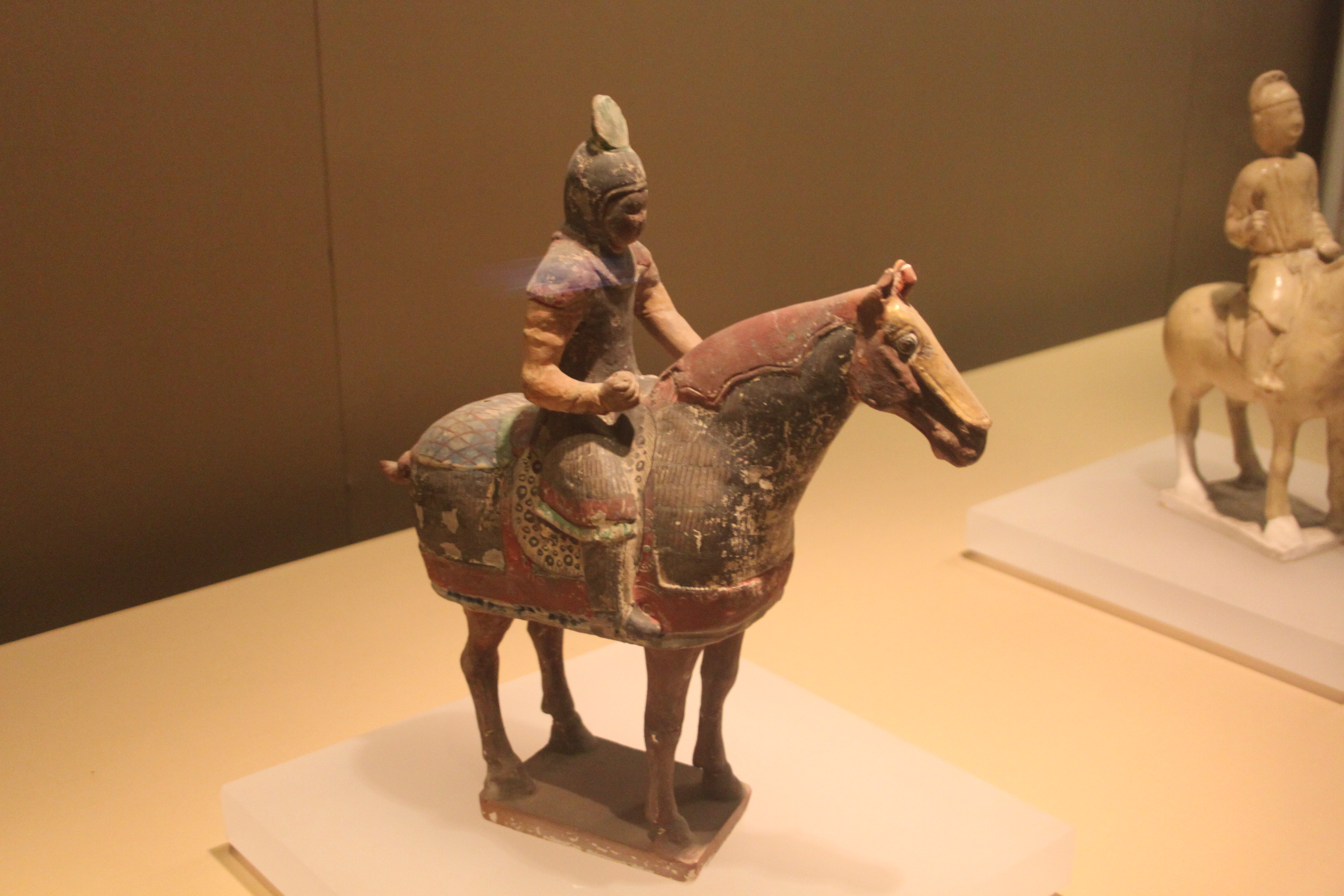
Armoured horseman, Tang dynasty

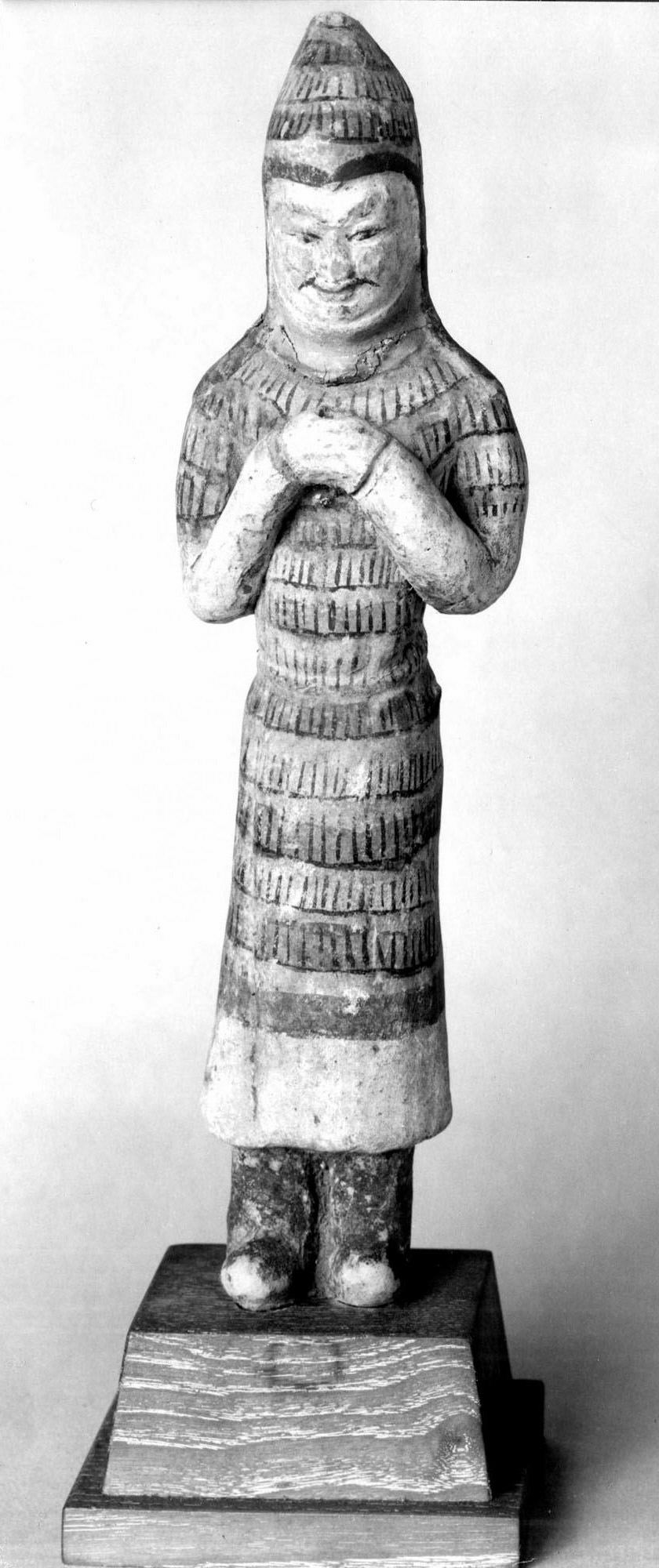
Tomb soldier figurine, Tang dynasty

By this point, Li Shimin and his older brother Li Jiancheng, who was created crown prince in 618, reportedly after Emperor Gaozu first offered the position to Li Shimin due to his contributions, were locked in an intense rivalry, as Li Shimin's accomplishments caused people to speculate that he would displace Li Jiancheng as crown prince, and Li Jiancheng, while an accomplished general himself, was overshadowed by his younger brother. The court became divided into a faction favoring the Crown Prince and a faction favoring the Prince of Qin. The rivalry was particularly causing problems within the capital, as the commands of the Crown Prince, the Prince of Qin, and the Prince of Qi Li Yuanji were said to have the same force as the emperor's edicts, and the officials had to carry conflicting orders out by acting on the ones that arrived first. Li Shimin's staff was full of talented men, but Li Jiancheng was supported by Li Yuanji, as well as Emperor Gaozu's concubines, who had better relationships with Li Jiancheng and Li Yuanji than they did with Li Shimin.

Late in 622, when Liu Heita returned east after receiving aid from the Eastern Turks, defeating and killing Li Shimin's cousin Li Daoxuan (李道玄), the Prince of Huaiyang, he again regained most of former Xia territory. Li Jiancheng's staff members Wang Gui and Wei Zheng suggested that Li Jiancheng needed to enhance his own reputation in battle, and so Li Jiancheng volunteered for the mission. Emperor Gaozu thus sent Li Jiancheng, assisted by Li Yuanji, to attack Liu. Li Jiancheng defeated Liu around the new year of 623, and Liu was subsequently betrayed by his own official Zhuge Dewei (諸葛德威) and delivered to Li Jiancheng. Li Jiancheng executed Liu in his former capital and returned to Chang'an in triumph. China was, by this point, roughly united under Tang rule.

For the next few years, the rivalry intensified, although during the meantime both Li Jiancheng and Li Shimin served as generals when the Eastern Göktürks made incursions. In 623, when the general Fu Gongshi rebelled at Danyang (丹楊, in modern Nanjing, Jiangsu), Emperor Gaozu briefly commissioned Li Shimin to attack Fu, but soon cancelled the order and sent Li Shimin's cousin Li Xiaogong the Prince of Zhao Commandery instead.

In 624, when Li Jiancheng was found to have, against regulations, tried to add soldiers to his guard corps, Emperor Gaozu was so angry that he put Li Jiancheng under arrest. In fear, Li Jiancheng's guard commander Yang Wen'gan (楊文幹) rebelled. Emperor Gaozu sent Li Shimin against Yang, offering to make him crown prince after he returned. After Li Shimin left, however, Feng Deyi (now a chancellor), Li Yuanji, and the concubines all spoke on Li Jiancheng's behalf, and after Li Shimin returned, Emperor Gaozu did not depose Li Jiancheng, but instead blamed the discord between him and Li Shimin on Li Jiancheng's staff members Wang Gui and Wei Ting (韋挺) and Li Shimin's staff member Du Yan, exiling them to Xi Prefecture (巂州, roughly modern Liangshan Yi Autonomous Prefecture, Sichuan).

Later that year, Emperor Gaozu, troubled by repeated Göktürk incursions, seriously considered burning Chang'an to the ground and moving the capital to Fancheng, a suggestion that Li Jiancheng, Li Yuanji, and Pei Ji agreed with. Li Shimin opposed, however, and the plan was not carried out. Meanwhile, Li Shimin himself was sending his confidants to Luoyang to build up his personal control of the army there. After an incident in which Li Shimin suffered a severe case of food poisoning after feasting at Li Jiancheng's palace—an event that both Emperor Gaozu and Li Shimin apparently interpreted as an assassination attempt—Emperor Gaozu considered sending Li Shimin to guard Luoyang to prevent further conflict, but Li Jiancheng and Li Yuanji, after consulting each other, believed that this would only give Li Shimin an opportunity to build up his personal power there, and therefore opposed it. Emperor Gaozu therefore did not carry out the plan. Meanwhile, the rivalry continued. Traditional historical accounts also indicated that at one point, when Li Shimin visited Li Yuanji's mansion, Li Yuanji wanted to assassinate Li Shimin, but Li Jiancheng, who could not resolve to kill a brother, stopped the plot. There was yet another incident in which Li Jiancheng, knowing that a horse threw its rider easily, had Li Shimin ride it, causing Li Shimin to fall off from it several times.

By 626, Li Shimin was fearful that he would be killed by Li Jiancheng, and his staff members Fang Xuanling, Du Ruhui, and Zhangsun Wuji were repeatedly encouraging Li Shimin to attack Li Jiancheng and Li Yuanji first—while Wei Zheng was encouraging Li Jiancheng to attack Li Shimin first. Li Jiancheng persuaded Emperor Gaozu to remove Fang and Du, as well as Li Shimin's trusted guard generals Yuchi Jingde and Cheng Zhijie, from Li Shimin's staff. Zhangsun Wuji, who remained on Li Shimin's staff, continued to try to persuade Li Shimin to attack first.

In summer 626, the Göktürks were making another attack, and under Li Jiancheng's suggestion, Emperor Gaozu, instead of sending Li Shimin to resist the Göktürks as he first was inclined, decided to send Li Yuanji instead. Li Yuanji was given command of much of the army previously under Li Shimin's control, further troubling Li Shimin, who believed that with the army in Li Yuanji's hands, he would be unable to resist an attack. Li Shimin had Yuchi summon Fang and Du back to his mansion secretly, and then on one night submitted an accusation to Emperor Gaozu that Li Jiancheng and Li Yuanji were committing adultery with Emperor Gaozu's concubines. Emperor Gaozu, in response, issued summonses to Li Jiancheng and Li Yuanji for the next morning, convening the senior officials Pei Ji, Xiao Yu, and Chen Shuda to examine Li Shimin's accusations. As Li Jiancheng and Li Yuanji approached the central gate leading to Emperor Gaozu's palace, Xuanwu Gate (玄武門), Li Shimin carried out the ambush he had set. He personally fired an arrow that killed Li Jiancheng. Subsequently, Yuchi Jingde killed Li Yuanji. Li Shimin's forces entered the palace and, under the intimidation of Li Shimin's forces, Emperor Gaozu agreed to create Li Shimin crown prince. Li Jiancheng's and Li Yuanji's sons were killed, and Li Shimin took Li Yuanji's wife Princess Yang as a concubine. Two months later, with Li Shimin firmly in control of power, Emperor Gaozu yielded the throne to him (as Emperor Taizong).

== As emperor ==
=== Early reign (626–633) ===
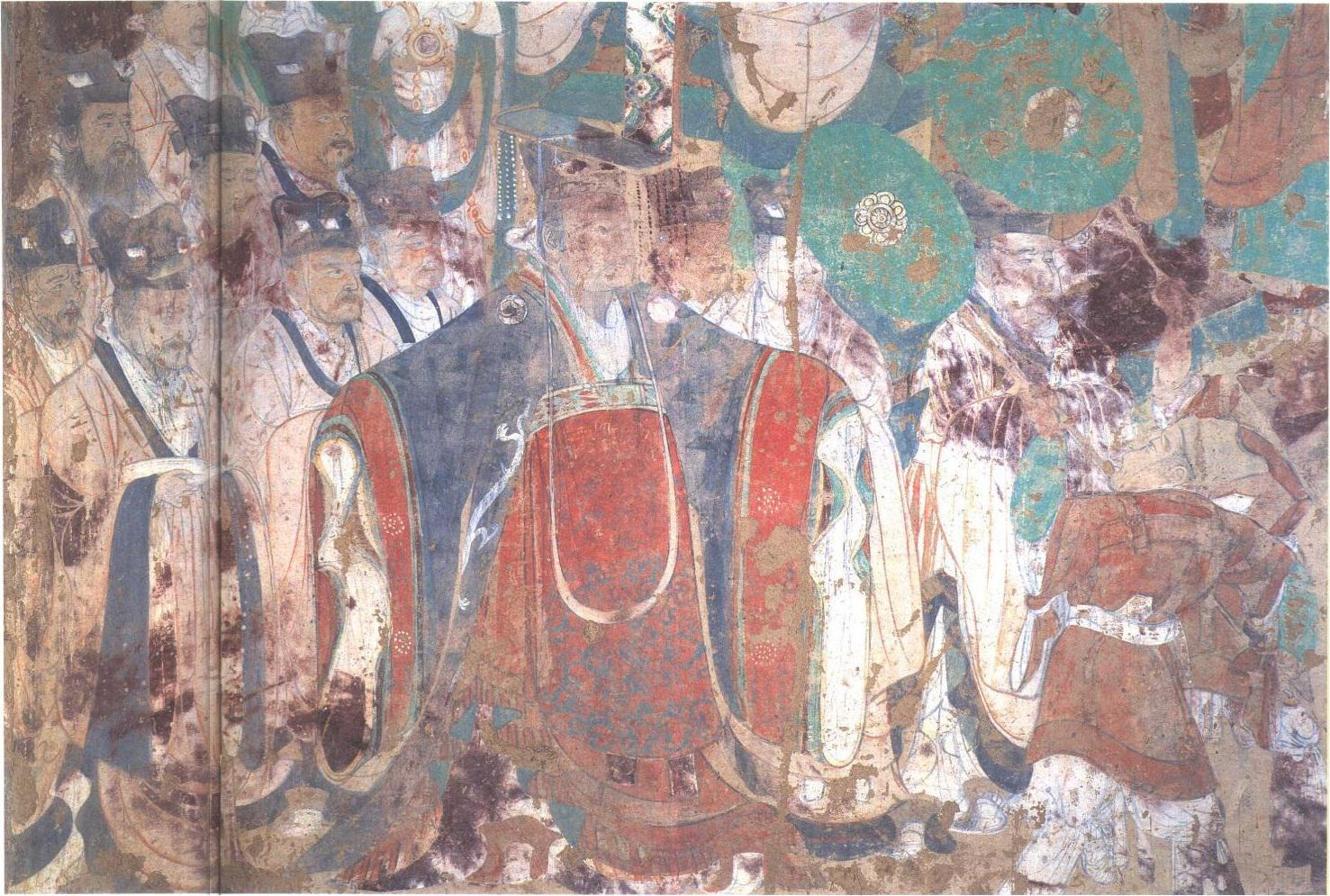
Left: Hanging Portrait of Emperor Taizong on a Ming dynasty hanging scroll, kept in the National Palace Museum, after a contemporary painting by Yan Liben Right: A mural painting of Emperor Taizong (located center) dated to AD 642, located in Cave 220, Dunhuang, Gansu.

One of the first actions that Emperor Taizong carried out as emperor was releasing a number of ladies in waiting from the palace and returning them to their homes, so that they could be married. He made his wife Princess Zhangsun the empress, and their oldest son Li Chengqian the crown prince.

Emperor Taizong also immediately faced a crisis, as the Eastern Turkic leader Illig Qaghan (Ashina Duobi), along with his nephew the subordinate Tuli Khan Ashina Shibobi (阿史那什鉢苾), launched a major incursion toward Chang'an, and just 19 days after Emperor Taizong took the throne, the two khans were just across the Wei River from Chang'an. Emperor Taizong, accompanied by Gao Shilian and Fang Xuanling, was forced to meet Ashina Duobi across the river and personally negotiate peace terms, including tributes to Eastern Turks, before Ashina Duobi withdrew.

Late in 626, Emperor Taizong ranked the contributors to Tang rule and granted them titles and fiefs, naming among the first rank of contributors Zhangsun Wuji, Fang Xuanling, Du Ruhui, Yuchi Jingde, and Hou Junji. When Li Shentong, as his distant uncle, objected to being ranked under Fang and Du, Emperor Taizong personally explained how Fang and Du's strategies allowed him to be successful, and this managed to get the other objectors to quiet down, as Emperor Taizong was even willing to rank low such an honored individual as Li Shentong. Emperor Taizong also buried Li Jiancheng and Li Yuanji with honors due imperial princes and had their staff members attend the funeral processions. Meanwhile, he appeared to begin to reshuffle government further—which he had already begun after being created crown prince—by dismissing his father's trusted advisors Xiao Yu and Chen Shuda, making his own trusted advisors chancellors. (Xiao, however, was soon restored to being chancellor, although his career during Emperor Taizong's reign would see repeated dismissals and repeated restorations.) However, he also began to greatly pay attention to the officials' submissions and their criticism of imperial governance, making changes where he saw needed. He also particularly began to trust Wei Zheng, accepting much advice from Wei as far as his personal conduct was concerned. He was also willing to demote his own trusted advisors, as he demoted Gao Shilian after finding that Gao had held back submissions from his deputy Wang Gui. Viewing Sui's Emperor Yang as a negative example, he frequently solicited criticism, rewarding those officials willing to offer them, particularly Wei and Wang Gui. His openness to opposing ideas was also evident in his attempt to reconcile traditional Taoist religion and Buddhism, as demonstrated in his Emperor's Preface to the Sacred Teachings (大唐三藏聖教序), and Emperor Taizong was at least a nominal Taoist.

==== Li Yi's Rebellion ====
Also in 627, the general Li Yi the Prince of Yan—a late-Sui warlord who later submitted to Tang, who associated with Li Jiancheng—fearing that Emperor Taizong would eventually take action against him, rebelled at Bin Prefecture (豳州, in modern Xianyang), but was quickly crushed by the official Yang Ji (楊岌) and killed in flight. Later that year, when Emperor Gaozu's cousin Li Youliang (李幼良) the Prince of Changle, the commandant at Liang Prefecture (涼州, roughly modern Wuwei, Gansu), was accused of allowing his staff to oppress the people and to trade with Qiang and Xiongnu tribesmen, Emperor Taizong sent the chancellor Yuwen Shiji (Yuwen Huaji's brother) to investigate, and in fear, Li Youliang's staff members plotted to hold him hostage and rebel. When this was discovered, Emperor Taizong forced Li Youliang to commit suicide. Late in the year, Wang Junkuo (王君廓), the commandant at You Prefecture (幽州, roughly modern Beijing), also rebelled, but was defeated quickly and killed in flight. However, although there were also reports that Feng Ang (馮盎), a warlord in the Lingnan region, was rebelling, Emperor Taizong, at Wei's suggestion, sent messengers to comfort Feng, and Feng submitted.

Also in 627, Emperor Taizong, seeing that there were too many prefectures and counties, consolidated and merged many of them, and further created another level of local political organization above prefectures—the circuit (道; dào)—dividing his state into 10 circuits.

==== Campaign against the Eastern Turks ====
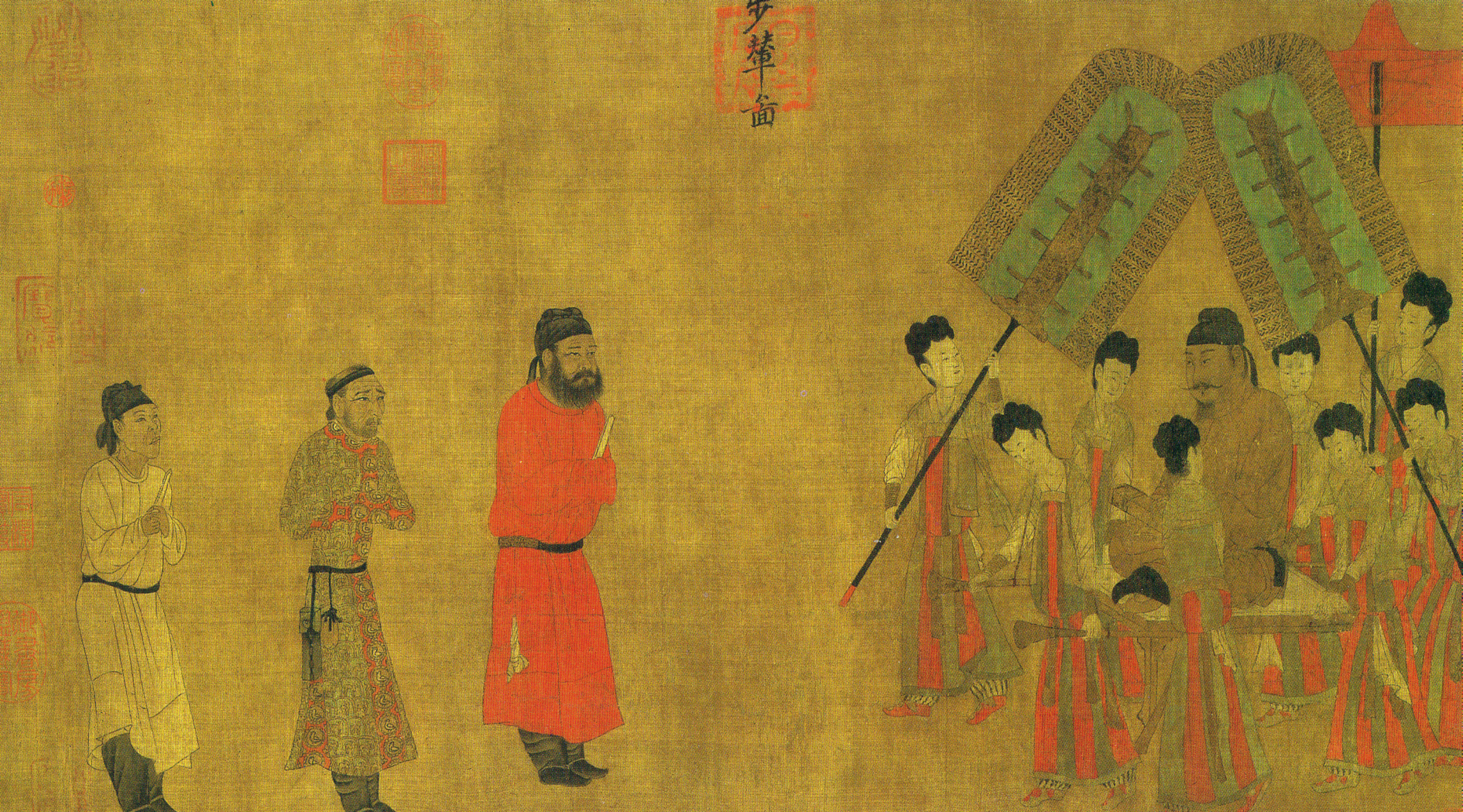
Emperor Taizong depicted giving an audience to Gar Tongtsen Yulsung, the ambassador of the Tibetan Empire, in a later copy of a painting by court artist Yan Liben (600–673 CE)

In 628, with Ashina Duobi and Ashina Shibobi having a falling out, Ashina Shibobi submitted to Emperor Taizong, as did the chieftains of Khitan tribes, who had previously submitted to the Eastern Turks. With their khaganate in turmoil, Ashina Duobi was no longer able to protect the last late-Sui rebel ruler who alone remained standing against Tang pressure—Liang Shidu the Emperor of Liang, and in summer 628, with the Tang generals Chai Shao and Xue Wanjun (薛萬均) sieging the Liang capital Shuofang (in modern Yulin, Shaanxi), Liang Shidu's cousin Liang Luoren (梁洛仁) killed Liang Shidu and surrendered, finally uniting China. With the Eastern Turkic Khaganate weakened, their vassal Xueyantuo also broke away and formed its own khanate, and Emperor Taizong entered into an alliance with Xueyantuo's leader Yinan, creating Yinan the Zhenzhupiqie Khan (or Zhenzhu Khan in short).

In late 629, believing the time ripe for a major attack on the Eastern Turks, Emperor Taizong commissioned the general Li Jing with overall command of a multi-pronged army, assisted by the generals Li Shiji, Li Daozong, Chai Shao, Xue Wanche (薛萬徹, Xue Wanjun's brother) and Su Dingfang, attacking the Eastern Turks at multiple points. The army was successful in its attacks, forcing Ashina Duobi to flee, and by late spring 630, Ashina Duobi had been captured, and Eastern-Turkic chieftains all submitted to Tang. Emperor Taizong spared Ashina Duobi but detained him at Chang'an, and he considered what to do with the Eastern Turks.

The main opposing views were from the chancellors Wen Yanbo (who advocated leaving the Turks within China's borders to serve as a defense perimeter) and Wei (who advocated leaving them outside the borders). Emperor Taizong accepted Wen's suggestion and established a number of prefectures to accommodate the Turks, leaving them governed by their chieftains without creating a new khan to govern them.

In 631, Emperor Taizong established a feudal scheme, where the contributors to his reign were given, in addition to their current posts, additional posts as prefectural governors, to be passed on to their descendants. Soon, however, receiving much opposition to the plan, the strongest of which came from Zhangsun Wuji, Emperor Taizong cancelled the scheme. After the conquest of the Eastern Turkic Khaganate, Emperor Taizong's officials repeatedly requested that he carry out sacrifices to heaven and earth at Mount Tai, and Emperor Taizong, while at times tempted by the proposal, was repeatedly dissuaded from doing so by Wei, who pointed out the expenses and the labors that would be imposed on the people as a result, and also that this would open China's borders to attack.

=== Middle reign (634–641) ===
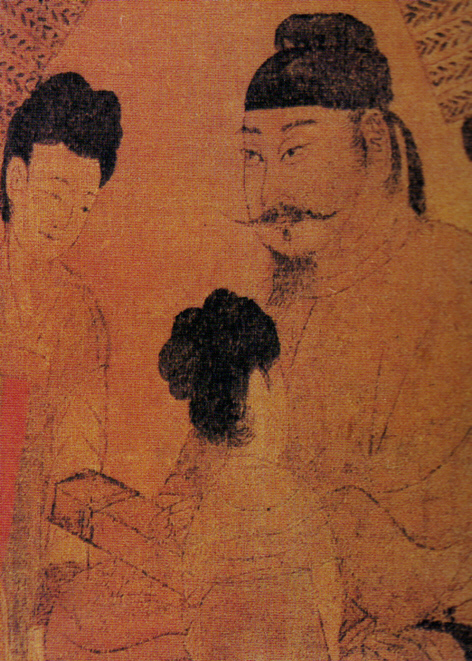
Detail of Yan Liben's painting on the reception of the Tibetan envoy, showing Tang Taizong

In 634, Emperor Taizong sent 13 high level officials, including Li Jing and Xiao Yu, to examine the circuits to see whether the local officials were capable, to find out whether the people were suffering, to comfort the poor, and to select capable people to serve in civil service. (Li Jing initially recommended Wei Zheng, but Emperor Taizong declined sending Wei, stating that Wei needed to stay to point out his faults and that he could not afford to have Wei away even for a single day.)

==== Campaign against Tuyuhun ====
Around this time, Tang was having increasing conflicts with Tuyuhun, whose Busabo Khan Murong Fuyun, under instigation by his strategist the Prince of Tianzhu, had been repeatedly attacking Tang prefectures on the borders. At one point, Murong Fuyun sought to have a Tang princess marry his son the Prince of Zun, but the marriage negotiations broke down over Emperor Taizong's insistence that the Prince of Zun come to Chang'an for the wedding. In summer 634, Emperor Taizong had the generals Duan Zhixuan and Fan Xing (樊興) lead forces against Tuyuhun, but with Tuyuhun's forces highly mobile and avoiding direct confrontation, Duan, while not defeated, could not make major gains. Once Duan withdrew, Tuyuhun resumed hostilities. In winter 634, with the Tibetan king Songtsän Gampo making overtures to marry a Tang princess as well, Emperor Taizong sent the emissary Feng Dexia (馮德遐) to Tibet with an eye toward an alliance against Tuyuhun. In winter 634, he commissioned Li Jing, assisted by the other generals Hou Junji, Xue Wanjun, Xue Wanche, Qibi Heli, Li Daozong, Li Daliang, Li Daoyan (李道彥), and Gao Zengsheng (高甑生), to attack Tuyuhun. In 635, Li Jing's forces crushed Tuyuhun forces. Murong Fuyun was killed by his own subordinates, and his son Murong Shun killed the Prince of Tianzhu and surrendered. Emperor Taizong created Murong Shun the new khan, although Murong Shun was soon assassinated. Emperor Taizong then created Murong Shun's son Murong Nuohebo as the new khan.

In 635, Emperor Gaozu died, and Emperor Taizong, observing a mourning period, briefly had Li Chengqian serve as regent, and after he resumed his authorities less than two months later, he still authorized Li Chengqian to thereafter rule on minor matters.

In spring 636, Emperor Taizong commissioned his brothers and sons as commandants and changed their titles in accordance with the commands that they received, sending them to their posts—with the exception of his son Li Tai the Prince of Wei, who by this point was beginning to be highly favored by him. He further allowed Li Tai to engage literary men to serve as his assistants, as Li Tai favored literature. From this point on, Li Tai would be so favored that there began to be talks that Emperor Taizong might let him displace Li Chengqian, whose favors began to wane. In fall 636, Empress Zhangsun died. Emperor Taizong mourned her bitterly and personally wrote the text of her monument.

In the summer of 637, Emperor Taizong recreated the feudal scheme that he had considered and abandoned in 631, creating 35 hereditary prefect posts. (By 639, however, the system was again abandoned after much opposition.)

==== Treatment of Noble Clans ====
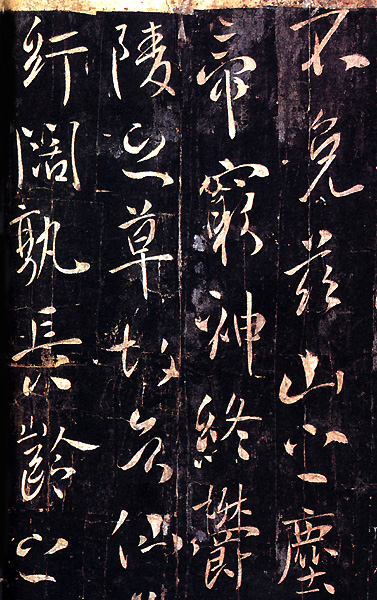
Fountain Memory, calligraphy of Emperor Taizong on a Tang stele.

Sometime before 638, Emperor Taizong, disgusted with the traditional noble clans of Cui, Lu, Li, and Zheng and believing that they were abusing their highly honored names, commissioned Gao Shilian, Wei Ting, Linghu Defen, and Cen Wenben to compile a work later to be known as the Records of Clans (氏族志), with the intent of dividing the clans into nine classes based on their past contributions, good deeds, and ill deeds. In an initial draft that Gao submitted, he nevertheless ranked the branch of the Cui clan that the official Cui Min'gan (崔民幹) belonged to as the highest, a decision that Emperor Taizong rebuked, as he pointed out that Gao was merely again looking at tradition and not the recent contributions. He therefore personally intervened in revising the work, reducing Cui's clan to the third class.

==== Tibetan attack on Songzhou ====
In fall 638, Tibet's Songtsän Gampo, displeased that Emperor Taizong had declined to give him a Tang princess in marriage and believing that Murong Nuohebo had persuaded Emperor Taizong to decline the marriage proposal, launched a major attack with forces of 200,000 on Tuyuhun and then on several Tang prefectures, putting Song Prefecture (松州, roughly modern Ngawa Tibetan and Qiang Autonomous Prefecture, Sichuan) under siege. Emperor Taizong commissioned Hou Junji, assisted by Zhishi Sili (執失思力), Niu Jinda (牛進達), and Liu Jian (劉簡), of a total of force of 50,000 to counterattack, and Niu, who commanded the forward forces, defeated Tibetan forces at Song Prefecture. Songsän Gampo withdrew and sued for peace but still sought to marry a Tang princess. Emperor Taizong agreed this time. Also in 638, believing that Xueyantuo was growing increasingly strong and difficult to control, Emperor Taizong granted Yinan's sons Bazhuo and Jialibi (頡利苾) both lesser khan titles, to try to create dissensions between them. In summer 639, Ashina Jiesheshuai (阿史那結社率), the younger brother of Ashina Shibobi, whom Emperor Taizong did not favor and gave little recognition to, formed a conspiracy with Ashina Shibobi's son Ashina Hexiangu (阿史那賀暹鶻) to assassinate Emperor Taizong. They had planned to wait for Li Zhi the Prince of Jin to depart from the palace in the morning and use that opportunity to attack the palace. On the day they planned, however, Li Zhi did not leave the palace, and Ashina Jiesheshuai attacked anyway but was quickly defeated, captured, and executed. After this incident, however, the officials began advocating sending the Turks away from the heart of the state. In fall 639, Emperor Taizong created a Turkish prince who had served him faithfully, Li Simo (né Ashina Simo) as the khan of a newly recreated Eastern Turkic state (as Qilibi Khan), giving him all of the Turks and Xiongnu who had surrendered as his subordinates, to be settled north of the Great Wall and the Yellow River. However, the Turks were fearful of Xueyantuo and initially refused to head to their new location. Emperor Taizong issued an edict to Yinan that he and Li Simo keep their peace and not attack each other, and after receiving from Yinan the assurance that he would not attack, the Turks advanced to the new location.

==== Campaign against Western Turks ====
Taizong began a series of campaigns against the Western Turks (Xitujue) and their allies, the oasis states of the Tarim Basin, around 640. These hostilities between the Western Turks and Tang would continue until the defeat and conquest of the Western Turks in 657 under Taizong's successor, Gaozong. The kingdoms of Shule and Khotan surrendered to the Chinese in 632, as did the kingdom of Yarkand in 635. Qu Wentai (麴文泰), the king of Gaochang, who had previously been submissive to Tang, had become increasingly hostile to Tang, allying with the Western Turks. In 640, Emperor Taizong commissioned Hou Junji, assisted by Xue Wanjun, to launch a major attack on Gaochang. As they approached Gaochang, Qu Wentai died in fear and was succeeded by his son Qu Zhisheng (麴智盛). Qu Zhisheng offered to submit, but Hou demanded a surrender, which Qu Zhisheng refused. However, Hou put Gaochang under siege, and with aid from the Western Turks not arriving, Qu Zhisheng surrendered. Wei Zheng suggested that Emperor Taizong allow Qu Zhisheng to remain king, pointing out that the monetary and human costs would be high to keep a permanent garrison at Gaochang, but Emperor Taizong disagreed, and he converted Gaochang into two prefectures and annexed it into his state.

In winter 640, Songsän Gampo sent his prime minister Gar Tongtsen Yülsung ("Lu Dongzan" (祿東贊) in Chinese) as an emissary to Tang, offering tributes and again requesting marriage. Emperor Taizong created a daughter of a clansman as the Princess Wencheng, and in 641 sent Li Daozong to accompany Princess Wencheng to Tibet to preside over the wedding. In winter 641, believing that Emperor Taizong was about to carry out sacrifices to heaven and earth at Mount Tai and would be unable to aid the Eastern Turks, Yinan launched a major attack on them, commanded by his son Dadu (大度). Li Simo was forced to retreat inside the Great Wall. Emperor Taizong commissioned Li Shiji, assisted by Zhang Jian (張儉), Li Daliang, Zhang Shigui (張士貴), and Li Xiyu (李襲譽), to attack Xueyantuo. Li Shiji soon defeated Dadu at Nuozhen River (諾真水, flowing through modern Baotou, Inner Mongolia), and Dadu fled.

=== Late reign (642–649) ===
Emperor Taizong's campaign against the oasis states

By 642, it was clear that Li Tai had ambitions on replacing his brother Li Chengqian, and the governmental officials began to be divided into pro-Li Chengqian and pro-Li Tai factions. After being urged by Wei Zheng and Chu Suiliang to take actions that would clarify that Li Chengqian's position was secure, Emperor Taizong attempted to do so by making repeated statements to that effect, but his continued favoring of Li Tai led to continued speculation among officials.

Also, by 642, Xueyantuo had posed a sufficiently serious threat (albeit still formally submissive) that Emperor Taizong saw two alternatives—destroying it by force or forming into a heqin relationship by marrying one of his daughters to Yinan. This particularly became an issue after the Tang general Qibi Heli (契苾何力), the chieftain of the Qibi Tribe, was kidnapped by his own subordinates and taken to Xueyantuo. In order to ransom Qibi, Emperor Taizong made a promise to eventually give his daughter Princess Xinxing to Yinan in marriage, and Yinan released Qibi. In the winter 642, an event took place in Goguryeo that would eventually precipitate wars between Tang and Goguryeo. According to Chinese accounts King Yeongnyu, the king of Goguryeo, was apprehensive about his general Yŏn Kaesomun and was plotting with his other officials to kill Yeon. When Yŏn received the news, he started a coup and killed the king and the high-level officials. He declared King Yeongnyu's nephew Ko Chang (King Bojang) king, while taking power himself with the title of Dae Mangniji (Korean: 대막리지; Hanja: 大莫離支, Generalissimo). When Emperor Taizong received the news, there were suggestions that an attack be launched against Goguryeo, suggestions that Emperor Taizong initially declined.

In spring 643, Wei died, and Emperor Taizong mourned him bitterly, authoring Wei's monument himself and, prior to Wei's death, promising to give his daughter Princess Hengshan in marriage to Wei's son Wei Shuyu (魏叔玉). Later in spring, Emperor Taizong commissioned 24 portraits at Lingyan Pavilion to commemorate the 24 great contributors to his reign.

==== Contacts with the Byzantine Empire ====
Fanciful modern representation of the Byzantine embassy to Tang Taizong in 643 CE

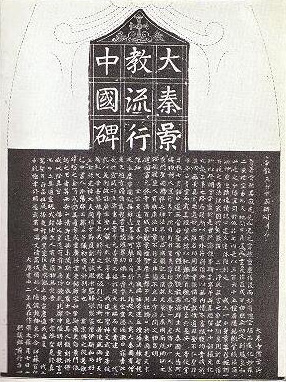
According to the Xi'an Stele, Emperor Taizong recognized the Nestorian Church of the East, due to efforts of the Christian missionary Alopen in 635 CE.

The Old Book of Tang and New Book of Tang mention several embassies made by Fu lin (拂菻; i.e. the Byzantine Empire), which they equated with Daqin (which may refer to the Roman Empire or Middle East), beginning in 643 with an embassy sent by the king Boduoli (波多力, i.e. Constans II Pogonatos) to Emperor Taizong, bearing gifts such as red glass and green gemstones. These histories also provided cursory descriptions of Constantinople and its walls, as well as how it was besieged by Da shi (大食; the Arabs of the Umayyad Caliphate) and their commander "Mo-yi" (摩拽; i.e. Muawiyah I, governor of Syria before becoming caliph), who forced the Byzantines to pay tribute. Henry Yule highlights the fact that Yazdegerd III (r. 632–651), last ruler of the Sasanian Empire, sent diplomats to China for securing aid from Emperor Taizong (considered the suzerain over Ferghana in Central Asia) during the loss of the Persian heartland to the Islamic Rashidun Caliphate, which may have also prompted the Byzantines to send envoys to China amid their recent loss of Syria to the Muslims. Tang Chinese sources also recorded how Sassanid prince Peroz III (636–679) fled to Tang China following the conquest of Persia by the growing Islamic caliphate.

The expansion of China's power into Central Asia under Emperor Taizong seems to have been noticed in the West. Theophylact Simocatta, a Byzantine Greek historian during the reign of Heraclius (r. 610–641), wrote that Taugast (or Taugas; Old Turkic: Tabghach, from Tuoba, the Xianbei clan of Northern Wei), was a great eastern empire in the Far East that ruled over Turkic people, with a capital city roughly 1,500 miles northeast from India that he called Khubdan (from the Turkic word Khumdan, meaning, Chang'an), where idolatry was practiced but the people were wise and lived by just laws. He depicted the Chinese empire as being divided by a great river (i.e. the Yangzi) that served as the boundary between two rival states at war, yet during the reign of Byzantine Emperor Maurice (582–602 CE) the northerners wearing "black coats" conquered the "red coats" of the south (black being a distinctive color worn by the people of Shaanxi, location of the Sui capital Sui Chang'an, according to the 16th-century Persian traveler Hajji Mahomed, or Chaggi Memet). This account may correspond to the conquest of the Chen dynasty and reunification of China by Emperor Wen of Sui (r. 581–604). Simocatta names their ruler as Taisson, which he claimed meant Son of God, either correlating to the Chinese Tianzi (i.e. Son of Heaven) or even the name of the contemporary ruler Emperor Taizong.

==== Succession dispute ====
In 643, Emperor Taizong would see major turmoil among his own closest family. His son Li You (李祐) the Prince of Qi, angry over restrictions that his secretary general Quan Wanji (權萬紀) often placed on him, killed Quan and declared a rebellion. Emperor Taizong sent Li Shiji against Li You, but before Li Shiji could engage Li You, Li You was captured by his own subordinate Du Xingmin (杜行敏) and delivered to Chang'an, where Emperor Taizong ordered him to commit suicide and executed 44 of his associates.

The death of Li You drew out news of another plot. Li Chengqian, who had been fearful that Emperor Taizong would eventually remove him and replace him with Li Tai, had begun to conspire with Hou Junji, Li Yuanchang (李元昌) the Prince of Han (Emperor Taizong's brother), the general Li Anyan (李安儼), and his brothers-in-law Zhao Jie (趙節) and Du He (杜荷, Du Ruhui's son) to overthrow Emperor Taizong. During the investigations in the aftermaths of Li You's rebellion, one of the co-conspirators, Li Chengqian's guard Gegan Chengji (紇干承基), was implicated by association, and in order to save himself, he revealed Li Chengqian's plot. Emperor Taizong was shocked by the news, and he appointed Zhangsun Wuji, Fang Xuanling, Xiao Yu, and Li Shiji, along with the officials in charge of the supreme court and the legislative and examination bureaus of the government to carry out a joint investigation. At the suggestion of the mid-level official Lai Ji, Emperor Taizong deposed, but did not kill, Li Chengqian, while ordering Li Yuanchang to commit suicide and executing Hou Junji, Li Anyan, Zhao, and Du.

Li Chengqian chose to speak Turkic, dress in Turkic clothes and even set up a tent in his residence in imitation of a Turkic khan. Taizong removed him from the position of heir apparent and chose as his successor Li Zhi, who embraced Han Chinese cultural heritage.

After Li Chengqian was deposed, Emperor Taizong briefly promised Li Tai that he would be made crown prince. However, as the investigations continued, Emperor Taizong came to the belief that Li Chengqian's downfall was driven by Li Tai's machinations and therefore resolved to depose Li Tai as well. At Zhangsun's suggestion, Emperor Taizong had a younger son, Li Zhi the Prince of Jin (who, like Li Chengqian and Li Tai, were born of Empress Zhangsun), made the crown prince, who was considered kinder and gentler, while exiling Li Chengqian and Li Tai. However, starting later that year, Emperor Taizong began to doubt whether Li Zhi's personality was sufficiently strong to serve as emperor, and he toyed with the idea of making another son, Li Ke the Prince of Wu, a son of his concubine Consort Yang (Emperor Yang of Sui's daughter), crown prince, but did not do so due to strong opposition by Zhangsun Wuji.

Meanwhile, coming to the belief that he made an ill-advised promise to Yinan to give him Princess Xinxing in marriage, Emperor Taizong demanded a large amount of bride price – 50,000 horses, 10,000 cows and camels, and 100,000 sheep—a price that Yinan agreed to, but could not immediately collect and deliver. Emperor Taizong used it as an excuse to cancel the marriage agreement. Meanwhile, as Wei Zheng had, prior to his death, recommended Hou Junji and Li Chengqian's staff member Du Zhenglun as chancellors, Emperor Taizong came to suspect that Wei was part of the plot as well. He destroyed the monument he had authored for Wei and cancelled the betrothal between Wei Shuyu and Princess Hengshan.

==== Campaign against the Karasahr ====
In 644, with Yanqi's king Long Tuqizhi (龍突騎支), who had assisted the Tang campaign to conquer Gaochang, turning against Tang and allying with the Western Turks, Emperor Taizong sent the general Guo Xiaoke (郭孝恪), the commandant at Anxi (安西, i.e., Gaochang) to launch a surprise attack on Yanqi. Guo caught Long Tuqizhi by surprise and captured him, making his brother Long Lipozhun (龍栗婆準) regent. (The Western Turkic viceroy Ashina Quli (阿史那屈利) subsequently captured Long Lipozhun and briefly occupied Yanqi, although he then, not wanting a direct confrontation with Tang, withdrew, and the Yanqi nobles made Long Tuqizhi's cousin Long Xuepoanazhi (龍薛婆阿那支) king.)

==== Goguryeo-Tang War ====
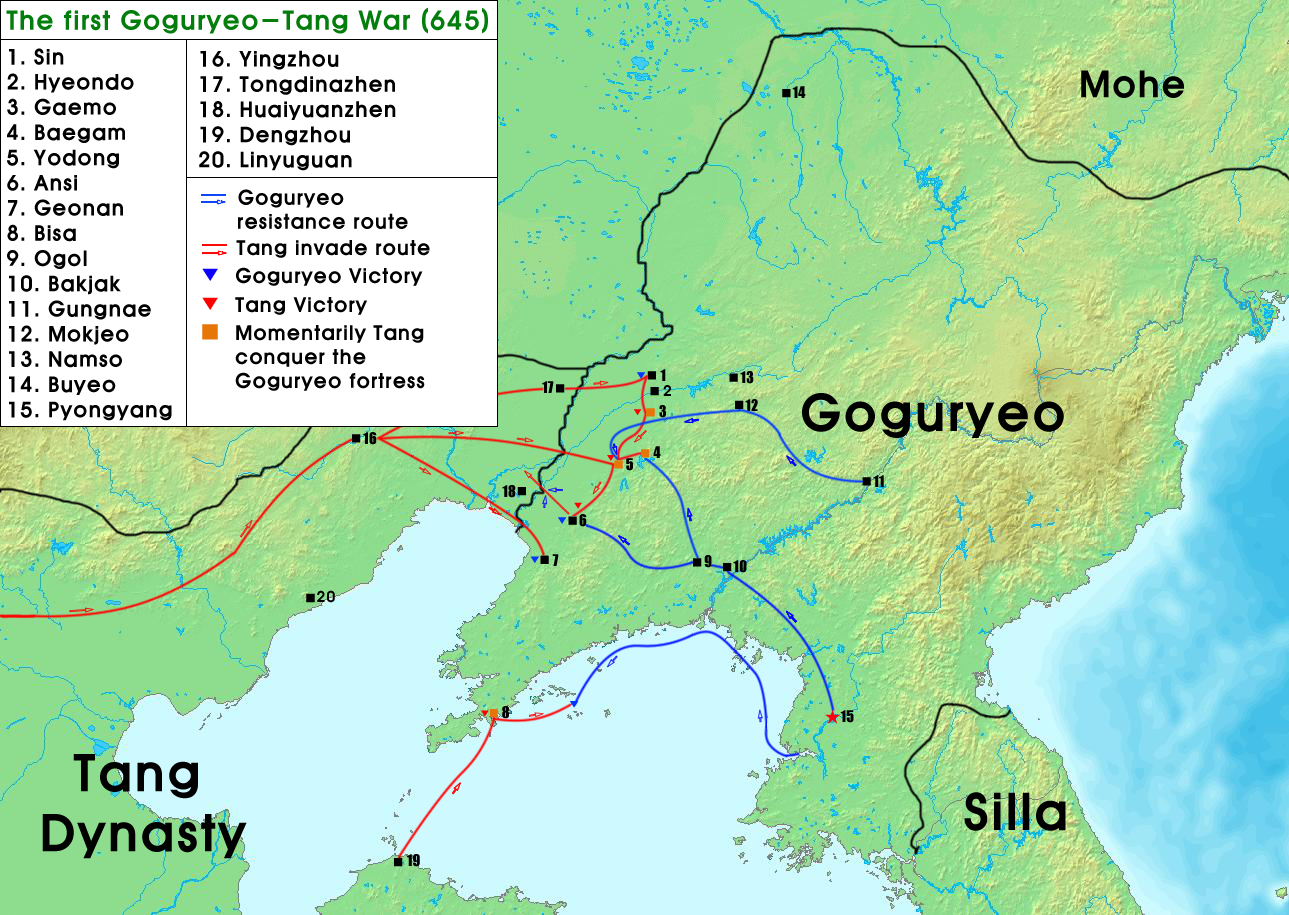
The Sui dynasty tried to invade Goguryeo in 598, 612, 613 and 614. Taizong campaign (map) was in 645. Gaozong's campaigns were in 661, 667 and 668.

Also in 644, with Goguryeo attacking Silla and Silla requesting aid, Emperor Taizong decided to prepare for a campaign to conquer Goguryeo. He arrested the emissaries that Yŏn sent to the Tang court, accusing them of disloyalty to King Yeongnyu. By winter 644, the mobilization was in full force. (Apparently because of Tang's preparation to attack Goguryeo, however, the reconstituted Eastern Turkic people, fearing an attack from Xueyantuo at a time that Tang would be ill-equipped to assist, panicked and abandoned their khan Li Simo, fleeing into Tang territory. Emperor Taizong reabsorbed the Eastern Turks into Tang, while making Li Simo a general in his army.)

In spring 645, Emperor Taizong departed from Luoyang and led the troops northeast, behind a vanguard of 60,000 commanded by Li Shiji and Li Daozong. At the same time, Zhang Liang led the other 40,000 from sea. By summer 645, Tang forces had captured Yodong Fortress (遼東, in modern Liaoyang, Liaoning) and headed southeast toward the Goguryeo capital Pyongyang. Emperor Taizong personally led about 30,000 Tang and tribal forces and defeated a 150,000-force commanded by two Gogureyo generals and then put Ansi (安市, in modern Anshan, Liaoning) fortress under siege.

However, the capable defense put up by Ansi's commanding general stymied Tang forces and, in late fall, after suffering some casualties, with winter fast approaching and his food supplies running out, Emperor Taizong withdrew. He much regretted launching the campaign and made the comment, "If Wei Zheng were still alive, he would never have let me launch this campaign." He re-erected the monument he authored for Wei and summoned Wei's wife and children to meet him, treating them well.

==== Campaign against Xueyantuo and conquest of the Kucha ====
Meanwhile, in the aftermaths of the Goguryeo campaign, Xueyantuo's Duomi Khan Bazhuo (son of Yinan, who had died earlier in 645) launched attacks against Tang's border prefectures, with largely inconclusive results. In spring 646, the Tang generals Qiao Shiwang (喬師望) and Zhishi Sili counterattacked, defeating Bazhuo's forces, causing him to flee. His vassals Huige, Pugu (僕骨), and Tongluo (同羅) tribes took the opportunity to rebel and attack him. Hearing this, Emperor Taizong launched a major attack, commanded by Li Daozong, Ashina She'er (阿史那社爾), Zhishi Sili, Qibi Heli, Xue Wanche, and Zhang Jian, against Xueyantuo. With Xueyantuo under attack from multiple sides, Bazhuo was killed by Huige forces, and the remaining Xueyantuo people fled and supported Bazhuo's cousin Duomozhi as Yitewushi Khan but soon offered to submit to Tang. Emperor Taizong sent Li Shiji toward Duomozhi's location, with the direction to either accept his submission or destroy him. Duomozhi surrendered and was taken to Chang'an, ending Xueyantuo's rule over the region. The other tribes formerly submissive to Xueyantuo offered Emperor Taizong the title of "Heavenly Khan" and thereafter largely became submissive to Tang. (Note: "...territories within his empire. He took the title "Heavenly Khan," thus designating himself as their ruler. A little later the Western Turks, although then at the height of their power, were badly defeated, and the Uighurs, a Turkish tribe, were detached from them and became sturdy supporters of the T'ang in the Gobi. The Khitan, Mongols in Eastern Mongolia and Southern Manchuria, made their submission (630). In the Tarim basin...") Tang nominally established seven command posts and six prefectures over the region. (Huige's khan Yaoluoge Tumidu (藥羅葛吐迷度), while submissive to Tang, for some time tried to take control over the region himself, but was subsequently assassinated in 648, and there would be no other organized attempt by Huige to take over the region until for about another century.)

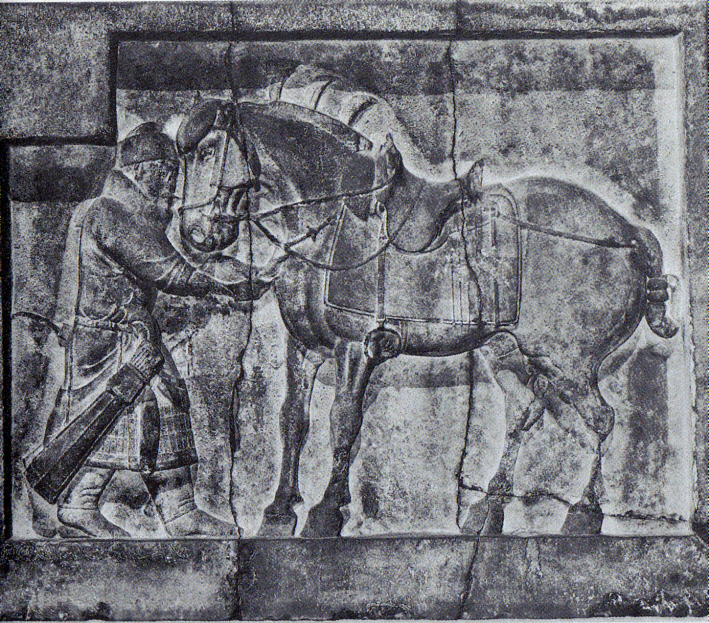
A bas-relief of a soldier and horse with elaborate saddle and stirrups, from the tomb of Emperor Taizong, c. 650. The relief shown here depicts "Autumn Dew", also known as "Whirlwind Victory", and is housed at the Penn Museum in Philadelphia, Pennsylvania.

After the victory over Xueyantuo, Emperor Taizong again turned his attention toward to Goguryeo, cutting off relations once more and considering another campaign. Under suggestions by some of his officials, he decided to launch harassment campaigns against Goguryeo's northern region on a yearly basis, to weaken Goguryeo gradually. The first of these campaigns was launched in spring 647, with Li Shiji and Niu Jinda in command and would reoccur. All this was in preparation of another campaign in 649 with forces totaling 300,000, but Taizong died before this campaign and the campaign was stalled into Gaozong's reign.

In 648, Emperor Taizong launched another campaign, commanded by Ashina She'er, aimed at Qiuzi, but first attacking Yanqi and killing Long Xuepoanazhi and replacing him with his cousin Long Xiannazhun (龍先那準). Ashina She'er advanced on Qiuzi and captured its king Bai Helibushibi (白訶黎布失畢), making his brother king instead.

== Death ==
By summer of 649, Emperor Taizong was seriously ill—with some believing that his illness was caused by the medicine he was administered by Buddhists or his taking of pills given to him by alchemists. Believing Li Shiji to be capable but fearing that he would not be submissive to Li Zhi, he demoted Li Shiji out of the capital to be the commandant at remote Die Prefecture (疊州, roughly modern Gannan Tibetan Autonomous Prefecture, Gansu), with instructions to Li Zhi that if Li Shiji hesitated, to execute him immediately, and if he did not, to recall him after Emperor Taizong's death and make him chancellor. Li Shiji, when receiving the order and realizing that his life was at stake, immediately departed for Die Prefecture. (Note: After Emperor Taizong's death, Li Zhi would indeed recall Li Shiji and make him chancellor. However, in Li Shiji's biographies in both Books of Tang, there was no mention of Taizong imploring Gaozong to execute Li. When annotating the Zizhi Tongjian, Hu Sanxing noted that just like how Emperor Taizong had calculated measures to guard against Li Shiji, Li Shiji similarly had calculated measures while serving his sovereigns. Later, during Gaozong's reign, Li Shiji would play an important role in Wu Zetian becoming empress, by informing Gaozong that appointing an empress was an emperor's "family affair".) Soon thereafter, Emperor Taizong, after entrusting Li Zhi to Zhangsun Wuji and Chu Suiliang, died at his summer palace Cuiwei Palace (翠微宮). His death was initially kept a secret, and three days later, after his casket had been returned to Chang'an, his death was announced, and Li Zhi took the throne as Emperor Gaozong.

== Religious views ==
Emperor Taizong stated he believed in the Tao, although his vision of it was a greatly syncretized version. He promoted religious tolerance and incorporated elements of Taoism, Confucianism, and Buddhism in his personal beliefs, while allowing the presence of Zoroastrianism, Judaism, Islam, Syriac Christianity (including the Church of the East), and other Middle Eastern religions within the empire.

== Monuments ==
After consolidating the Tang Empire, Emperor Taizong ordered six large stone panels, known as Zhaoling Liujun (昭陵六駿), to be carved with the portraits of his favorite horses. These were the horses he had ridden in overcoming his rivals and securing the borders of the country.

Since I engaged in military campaigns, those war chargers which carried me rushing on the enemy and breaking the line, and which rescued me from perils, their true images should be portrayed on stone and be placed left and right of my tomb to demonstrate the righteousness of "curtain and cover."

Emperor Taizong further composed laudatory poems for each of the six horses depicted in the stone reliefs. Constructed between 636 and 649 CE, the stone reliefs "exemplify the beauty of early Tang sculpture; the images are realistic yet powerful, created with simplicity and matured craftsmanship."

After Taizong's death, the monuments were situated along the east and west sides of the "spirit path" at the North Gate of the tomb complex named Zhaoling or Zhao Mausoleum. The six stone horse reliefs remained at the Mausoleum until the early twentieth century, when four were removed to the Beilin Museum in Xi'an, China, and two were sold and subsequently donated to the Penn Museum in Philadelphia in 1921.

== Era name ==
- Zhenguan (traditional Chinese: 貞觀; simplified Chinese: 贞观; pinyin: zhēnguàn) 627–649

== Chancellors during reign ==
Name	In office	Notes
Xiao Yu	(626, 627, 630, 643–646)	
Chen Shuda	(626)	
Feng Deyi	(626–627)	
Yuwen Shiji	(626–627)	
Gao Shilian	(626–627, 638–647)	
Fang Xuanling	(626–643, 643–648)	
Zhangsun Wuji	(627–628, 645–649)	
Du Yan	(627–628)	
Du Ruhui	(628–629)	
Li Jing	(628–634)	
Wang Gui	(628–633)	
Wei Zheng	(629–642)	
Wen Yanbo	(630–637)	
Dai Zhou	(630–633)	
Hou Junji	(630–632, 632–643)	
Yang Shidao	(636–643, 645)	
Liu Ji	(639–645)	
Cen Wenben	(642–645)	
Li Shiji	(643–649)	
Zhang Liang	(643–646)	
Ma Zhou	(644–648)	
Chu Suiliang	(644–647, 648–649)	
Xu Jingzong	(645)	(Note: Xu Jingzong, Gao Jifu, and Zhang Xingcheng were referred to as de facto chancellors by the New Book of Tang, but this appeared to be a temporary measure during the Goguryeo campaign with Emperor Taizong out of Tang territory and Li Zhi in charge temporarily. Xu, Gao, Zhang (each of whom would be later made chancellor) were not again referred to as chancellors until they were made chancellors after Emperor Taizong's death, even though they were not explicitly removed.)
Gao Jifu	(645)	
Zhang Xingcheng	(645)	
Cui Renshi	(648)	

== Family ==
- Empress Wende, of the Zhangsun clan of Henan (文德皇后 河南長孫氏／河南长孙氏; 601–636)
  - Li Chengqian, Prince Min of Hengshan (恆山愍王／恒山愍王 李承亁; 618–645), 1st son
  - Li Tai, Prince Gong of Pu (濮恭王 李泰; 620–653), 4th son
  - Princess Changle (長樂公主／长乐公主; 621–643), personal name Lizhi (麗質／丽质), 5th daughter
    - Married Zhangsun Chong of Henan (河南 長孫衝／长孙冲), eldest son of Zhangsun Wuji, in 633, and had issue (one son)
  - Li Zhi, Emperor Gaozong (高宗 李治; 628–683), 9th son
  - Princess Chengyang (城陽公主／城阳公主; d. 671), 16th daughter
    - Married Du He of Jingzhao, Duke of Xiangyang Commandery (襄陽郡公／襄阳郡公 京兆 杜荷; 616–643), second son of Du Ruhui
    - Married Xue Guan of Hedong, Marquis of Hedong County (河東縣開國侯 河東 薛瓘／河东县开国侯 河东 薛瓘), in 643, and had issue (two sons)
  - Princess Jinyang (晉陽公主／晋阳公主; 633–644), courtesy name Mingda (明達／明达), 19th daughter
  - Princess Xincheng (新城公主; 634–663), 21st daughter
    - Married Zhangsun Quan of Henan (河南 長孫詮／长孙诠; 636–659) in 649
    - Married Wei Zhengju of Jingzhao (京兆 韋正矩／韦正矩; d. 663) in 660
- Noble Consort, of the Wei clan of Jingzhao (貴妃 京兆韋氏／贵妃 京兆韦氏; 597–665), personal name Gui (珪)
  - Princess Linchuan (臨川公主／临川公主; 624–682), courtesy name Mengjiang (孟薑／孟姜), 10th daughter
    - Married Zhou Daowu of Runan, Duke of Qiao Commandery (諫郡公 汝南 周道務／谯郡公 汝南 周道务), and had issue (three sons, two daughters)
  - Li Shen, Prince of Ji (紀王 李慎／纪王 李慎; d. 689), 10th son
- Noble Consort, of the Yang clan (貴妃 楊氏／贵妃 杨氏)
  - Li Fu, Prince of Zhao (趙王 李福／赵王 李福; 634–670), 13th son
- Consort, of the Yang clan (妃 楊氏／杨氏)
  - Li Ke, Prince of Wu (吳王／吴王 李恪; 619–653), 3rd son
  - Li Yin, Prince Dao of Shu (蜀悼王 李愔; d. 667), 6th son
- Consort, of the Yin clan (妃 陰氏/阴氏)
  - Li You, Prince of Qi (齊王／齐王 李佑; c. 621–643), 5th son
- Virtuous Consort, of the Yan clan (德妃 燕氏; 609–671)
  - Li Zhen, Prince Jing of Yue (越敬王 李貞／李贞; 627–688), 8th son
  - Li Xiao, Prince Shang of Jiang (江殤王 李囂／江殇王 李嚣; d. 632), 11th son
- Able Consort, of the Zheng clan (賢妃／贤妃 郑氏)
- Able Consort, of the Xu clan (賢妃／贤妃 徐氏; 627–650), personal name Hui (惠)
- Lady of Bright Countenance, of the Wei clan (昭容 韋氏／韦氏), personal name Nizi (尼子)
- Concubine, of a certain clan (下嬪／下嫔 某氏) (Note: Died in chilbirth)
  - Princess Yuzhang (豫章公主), 6th daughter
    - Married Tang Yishi (唐義識／唐义识), son of Tang Jian, in 637, and had issue (one son)
- Lady of Beauty, of the Xiao clan (美人 蕭氏／萧氏)
- Lady of Talent, of the Wu clan (才人 武氏; 624–705), commonly known as Wu Zetian, personal name potentially originally Zhao (照) later changed to Zhao (曌/瞾) (Note: Her cousin's son Zong Qinke created a number of new characters in December 689, and she chose 曌 as her given name, which became her taboo name when she ascended the throne the next year. Some sources assert that this character was actually written 瞾. Some sources (e.g., Bo Yang Edition of the Zizhi Tongjian, vols. 47–49) also assert that her original given name was Zhao and that in 689 she only changed the written character, but this is confirmed by neither the Old Book of Tang nor the New Book of Tang, neither of which stated her original given name. Her grandson Li Chongzhao, sometime after she became emperor, changed his name to Li Chongrun to observe naming taboo for her, and the character of "Zhao" in Li Chongzhao's name was 照. See Old Book of Tang, vol. 86 and New Book of Tang, vol. 81.)
- Lady of Talent, of the Cui clan of Qinghe (才人 清河崔氏)
- Lady of Talent, of the Xiao clan (才人 蕭氏／萧氏)
- Princess Consort, of the Yang clan of Hongnong (王妃 弘農楊氏／弘农杨氏) (Note: Primary wife of Emperor Taizong's youngest full brother, Li Yuanji.)
  - Li Ming, Prince Gong of Cao (曹恭王 李明; d. 682), 14th son
- Lady, of the Wang clan (王氏)
  - Li Yun, Prince of Jiang (蔣王 李惲／蒋王 李恽; d. 674), 7th son
- Lady, of the Gao clan (高氏)
- Unknown
  - Li Kuan, Prince of Chu (楚王 李寬／李宽; b. 619), 2nd son
  - Li Jian, Prince of Dai (代王 李簡／李简; 631), 12th son
  - Princess Xiangcheng (襄城公主; d. 651), 1st daughter
    - Married Xiao Rui of Lanling, Duke of Song (宋國公 蘭陵 蕭銳／宋国公 兰陵 箫锐), eldest son of Xiao Yu
  - Princess Runan (汝南公主; d. 636), 2nd daughter
  - Princess Nanping (南平公主; d. 650), 3rd daughter
    - Married Wang Jingzhi, Baron of Nancheng County (南城縣男／南城县男 王敬直), youngest son of Wang Gui, in 637
    - Married Liu Xuanyi of Henan, Duke of Yu (渝國公 河南 劉玄意／渝国公 河南 刘玄意), eldest son of Liu Zhenghui, in 643
  - Princess Sui'an (遂安公主; d. 651), 4th daughter
    - Married Dou Kui of Henan, Baron of Xindou County (信都縣男 河南 竇逵／信都县男 河南 窦逵), grandson of Dou Kang, and had issue (one son)
    - Married Wang Dali of Henan (河南 王大禮／王大礼; 613–669), and had issue (two sons)
  - Princess Baling (巴陵公主; d. 653), 7th daughter
    - Married Chai Lingwu, Duke of Xiangyang Commandery (襄陽郡公／襄阳郡公 柴令武; d. 653), second son of Chai Shao
  - Princess Pu'an (普安公主), 8th daughter
    - Married Shi Renbiao, Duke of Dou (竇國公／窦国公 史仁表), eldest son of Shi Danai
  - Princess Dongyang (東陽公主／东阳公主; d. 701), 9th daughter
    - Married Gao Luxing of Bohai, Duke of Shen (申國公／申国公 渤海 高履行), eldest son of Gao Shilian
  - Princess Qinghe (清河公主; 624–664), personal name Jing (敬), courtesy name Dexian (德賢／德贤), 11th daughter
    - Married Cheng Huailiang, Duke of Dong'a County (東阿縣公 程懷亮／东阿县公 程怀亮), second son of Cheng Zhijie, in 633
  - Princess Lanling (蘭陵公主／兰陵公主; 628–659), personal name Shu (淑), courtesy name Lizhen (丽贞／麗貞), 19th daughter
    - Married Dou Huaizhe of Henan (河南 竇懷悊／窦怀哲), in 636, and had issue (one daughter)
  - Princess Jin'an (晉安公主／晋安公主), 13th daughter
    - Married Wei Si'an of Jingzhao (京兆 韋思安／韦思安)
    - Married Yang Renlu of Hongnong (弘農 楊仁輅／弘农 杨仁辂)
  - Princess Ankang (安康公主), 14th daughter
    - Married Dugu Chen of Henan (河南 獨孤諶／独孤谌), in 643
  - Princess Xinxing (新興公主/新兴公主), 15th daughter
    - Married Zhangsun Xi of Henan (河南 長孫曦／长孙曦)
  - Princess Gaoyang (高陽公主／高阳公主; d. 653), 17th daughter
    - Married Fang Yi'ai of Qinghe (清河 房遺愛／房遗爱; d. 653), second son of Fang Xuanling, in 648
  - Princess Jinshan (金山公主), 18th daughter
  - Princess Changshan (常山公主), 20th daughter
  - Princess of Dingxiang County (定襄縣主／定襄县主; 610–653), stepdaughter (Note: Daughter of Noble Consort Wei from her first marriage to Li Xiaomin (李孝珉).)
    - Married Ashina Zhong, Duke of Xue (薛國公／薛国公 阿史那忠; 611–675)

== In popular culture ==
- Portrayed by Peter Yang in the 1970 Chinese film Emperor Taizong Tours the Underworld and Returns to Life.
- Portrayed by Stanley Fung in the 1976 CTV TV series Rise of Tang Dynasty.
- Portrayed by Atsuo Nakamura in the 1978-1980 NTV TV series Monkey.
- Portrayed by Wang Guangkuan in the 1982 Chinese film Shaolin Temple.
- Portrayed by Zhang Zhiming in the 1982-2000 CCTV TV series Journey to the West.
- Portrayed by Michael Miu in the 1984 TVB TV series The Foundation.
- Portrayed by Kong Hon in the 1984 ATV TV series Empress Wu.
- Portrayed by Lau Siu-ming in the 1985 TVB TV series Legend Of The General Who Never Was and in the 1986 TVB TV series General Father, General Son.
- Portrayed by Liang Hsiu-shen in the 1985-1986 CTV TV series The Empress of the Dynasty.
- Portrayed by Sean Lau in the 1987 TVB TV series The Grand Canal.
- Portrayed by Tong Ruimin in the 1991 TV series Famous Chancellor of the Tang Dynasty.
- Portrayed by Wang Zhifei in the 1992 Chinese film Chivalrous and Romantic.
- Portrayed by Huang Hsiang-lien in the 1992 CTV TV series Legends of the Great Tang.
- Portrayed by Lim Byung Ki in the 1992-1993 KBS TV series The Three Kingdoms.
- Portrayed by Yosuke Natsuki in the 1993 NTV TV series Monkey.
- Portrayed by Wilson Lam in the 1994 TTV TV series New Sui and Tang Romance.
- Portrayed by Bao Guo'an in the 1995 CCTV TV series Wu Zetian.
- Portrayed by Cheung Siu-fai in the 1996 TV series Ancient Heroes, in the 1999 TV series Road To Eternity.
- Portrayed by Wang Ying Shen in the 1996 CCTV TV series Heroes in Sui and Tang Dynasties.
- Portrayed by Cheng Pak-lun in the 1996 TVB TV series Journey to the West.
- Portrayed by Vincent Chiao in the 1997 EBC TV series You Long Jing Feng.
- Portrayed by Poon Chi-man in the 1998 TVB TV series Journey to the West II.
- Portrayed by Pu Cunxin in the 1998-1999 ATV TV series The Love Story In The Fantasyland.
- Portrayed by Louis Fan in the 2000 TV series New Shaolin Temple.
- Portrayed by Jamie Weng in the 2000 TV series Peach Blossoms in Troubled Times.
- Portrayed by Wang Guanghui in the 2000 SXTV TV series Journey to the West Afterstory.
- Portrayed by Tang Guoqiang in the 2001 TV series Love Legend of the Tang Dynasty, in the 2007 CCTV-1 TV series Carol of Zhenguan and in the 2011 HBS TV series Secret History of Empress Wu.
- Portrayed by Hong Yuzhou in the 2001 CCTV TV series Princess Wencheng.
- Portrayed by Chan Wing Chun in the 2001 TVB TV series Colourful Life.
- Portrayed by Eddy Ko in the 2002 TVB TV series The Monkey King: Quest for the Sutra.
- Portrayed by Chen Baoguo in the 2002 FTV TV series Fan Lihua.
- Portrayed by Zheng Guolin in the 2003 TV series Heroes of the Sui and Tang Dynasties, in the 2014 Hunan TV TV series Heroes of Sui and Tang Dynasties and in the 2017 Youku TV series Detective Samoyeds.
- Portrayed by Kou Zhenhai in the 2003 CTS TV series Lady Wu: The First Empress.
- Portrayed by Liu Kai-chi in the 2004 TVB TV series Lady Fan.
- Portrayed by Yu Yang in the 2004 TV series Silly Little Li Yuanba.
- Portrayed by Yang Sheng in the 2004 TV series Romance in Vinegar.
- Portrayed by Johnson Yuen in the 2004 TVB TV series Twin of Brothers.
- Portrayed by Peter Ho in the 2005 TV series The Prince of Qin, Li Shimin.
- Portrayed by Liu Wei in the 2006 CDTV-4/TVS2 TV series Wu Zi Bei Ge.
- Portrayed by Shen Xiaohai in the 2006 TV series Initiating Prosperity.
- Portrayed by Li Junfeng in the 2006 CTV TV series Romance of Red Dust.
- Portrayed by Wang Weiguo in the 2006 TV series Legendary warrior.
- Portrayed by Ma Yue in the 2006 BTV TV series The Rise of the Tang Empire and in the 2021 TVB TV series Court Lady.
- Portrayed by Lee Joo-hyeon and Seo In-seok in the 2006-2007 SBS TV series Yeon Gaesomun.
- Portrayed by Song Yong-tae in the 2006-2007 KBS1 TV series Dae Jo-yeong.
- Portrayed by Tse Kwan-ho in the 2007 CCTV TV series King Qian in Wuyue.
- Portrayed by Jimmy Lin in the 2009 CCTV-8 TV series The Legend of Shaolin Kung Fu 2.
- Portrayed by Liu Changchun in the 2009 documentary drama Legend of The Tang Empire.
- Portrayed by Kwok Fung in the 2010 TVB TV series Can't Buy Me Love.
- Portrayed by Zhu Yongteng in the 2010 ZJTV TV series Journey to the West.
- Portrayed by Tong Chun-chung in the 2011 TVS TV series Journey to the West.
- Portrayed by Wu Qingzhe in the 2011 CCTV-1 TV series Twin of Brothers.
- Portrayed by Huang Haibing in the 2011 GZBN TV series Beauty World.
- Portrayed by He Gang in the 2012 Tencent Video TV series Intelligent Detective.
- Portrayed by Ma Tianyu in the 2012 HBS TV series Xuan-Yuan Sword: Scar of Sky.
- Portrayed by Yoon Seung-won in the 2012-2013 KBS TV series Dream of the Emperor.
- Portrayed by Yu Shaoqun in the 2012-2013 Hunan TV/Jiangsu TV TV series Heroes of Sui and Tang Dynasties.
- Portrayed by Du Chun in the 2013 Dragon TV/SDTV/SZMG/HEBTV/ZJTV TV series Heroes in Sui and Tang Dynasties.
- Portrayed by He Zhonghua in the 2013 Chinese film Yuchi Gong.
- Portrayed by Zhang Fengyi in the 2014-2015 Hunan TV TV series The Empress of China.
- Portrayed by Qin Junjie in the 2017 CCTV-8 TV series The World of Chang'An.
- Portrayed by Choi Hyunsoo in the 2017 KBS1 TV series Chronicles of Korea.
- Portrayed by Ken Chang in the 2017 iQIYI TV series Tang Dynasty Tour.
- Portrayed by Park Sung-woong in the 2018 Korean film The Great Battle.
- Portrayed by Liu Zhuoting in the 2018 Chinese film The Incident at Xuanwu Gate.
- Portrayed by Yide Ge in the 2018 Chinese film little hero from shaolin.
- Portrayed by Ding Yuxuan in the 2019 Tencent Video TV series Journey to the West.
- Portrayed by Geng Le in the 2021 Netflix/YouTube/Viu/Tencent Video TV series The Long Ballad.
- Portrayed by Tan Kai in the 2021 Hunan TV TV series Weaving a Tale of Love.
- Portrayed by Yang Hyun-min in the 2026 KBS2 TV series Sword & Silence.

== See also ==
- Chinese emperors family tree (middle)
- Turks in the Tang military

== Bibliography ==
- Adshead, S. A. M. (1995) [1988], China in World History (2nd ed.), New York: Palgrave Macmillan and St. Martin's Press, ISBN 978-0-333-62132-5
- Andrade, Tonio (2016), The Gunpowder Age: China, Military Innovation, and the Rise of the West in World History, Princeton University Press, ISBN 978-0-691-13597-7.
- Asimov, M.S. (1998), History of civilizations of Central Asia Volume IV The age of achievement: A.D. 750 to the end of the fifteenth century Part One The historical, social and economic setting, UNESCO Publishing
- Ball, Warwick (2016), Rome in the East: Transformation of an Empire (2nd ed.), London: Routledge, ISBN 978-0-415-72078-6
- Barfield, Thomas (1989), The Perilous Frontier: Nomadic Empires and China, Basil Blackwell
- Barrett, Timothy Hugh (2008), The Woman Who Discovered Printing, Great Britain: Yale University Press, ISBN 978-0-300-12728-7
- Beckwith, Christopher I (1987), The Tibetan Empire in Central Asia: A History of the Struggle for Great Power among Tibetans, Turks, Arabs, and Chinese during the Early Middle Ages, Princeton University Press
- Bregel, Yuri (2003), An Historical Atlas of Central Asia, Brill
- Drompp, Michael Robert (2005), Tang China and the Collapse of the Uighur Empire: A Documentary History, Brill
- Ebrey, Patricia Buckley (1999), The Cambridge Illustrated History of China, Cambridge: Cambridge University Press, ISBN 0-521-66991-X (paperback).
- Ebrey, Patricia Buckley; Walthall, Anne; Palais, James B. (2006), East Asia: A Cultural, Social, and Political History, Boston: Houghton Mifflin, ISBN 0-618-13384-4
- Golden, Peter B. (1992), An Introduction to the History of the Turkic Peoples: Ethnogenesis and State-Formation in Medieval and Early Modern Eurasia and the Middle East, Wiesbaden: Otto Harrassowitz
- Graff, David A. (2002), Medieval Chinese Warfare, 300–900, Warfare and History, London: Routledge, ISBN 0415239559
- Graff, David Andrew (2016), The Eurasian Way of War Military Practice in Seventh-Century China and Byzantium, Routledge, ISBN 978-0-415-46034-7.
- Haywood, John (1998), Historical Atlas of the Medieval World, AD 600–1492, Barnes & Noble
- Latourette, Kenneth Scott (1964), The Chinese, their history and culture, Volumes 1–2, Macmillan
- Lorge, Peter A. (2008), The Asian Military Revolution: from Gunpowder to the Bomb, Cambridge University Press, ISBN 978-0-521-60954-8
- Luttwak, Edward N. (2009), The Grand Strategy of the Byzantine Empire, The Belknap Press of Harvard University Press
- Millward, James (2009), Eurasian Crossroads: A History of Xinjiang, Columbia University Press
- Needham, Joseph (1986), Science & Civilisation in China, vol. V:7: 'The Gunpowder Epic', Cambridge University Press, ISBN 0-521-30358-3
- Rong, Xinjiang (2013), Eighteen Lectures on Dunhuang, Brill
- Schafer, Edward H. (1985), The Golden Peaches of Samarkand: A study of T'ang Exotics, University of California Press
- Shaban, M. A. (1979), The ʿAbbāsid Revolution, Cambridge: Cambridge University Press, ISBN 0-521-29534-3
- Sima, Guang (2015), 柏楊版資治通鑑54皇后失蹤, Yuǎnliú chūbǎnshìyè gǔfèn yǒuxiàn gōngsī, ISBN 978-957-32-0876-1
- Skaff, Jonathan Karam (2012), Sui-Tang China and Its Turko-Mongol Neighbors: Culture, Power, and Connections, 580–800 (Oxford Studies in Early Empires), Oxford University Press
- Twitchett, Denis C. (1979), The Cambridge History of China, Vol. 3, Sui and T'ang China, 589–906, Cambridge University Press
- Wang, Zhenping (2013), Tang China in Multi-Polar Asia: A History of Diplomacy and War, University of Hawaii Press
- Wilkinson, Endymion (2015). Chinese History: A New Manual (4th ed.). Cambridge, MA: Harvard University Asia Center distributed by Harvard University Press. ISBN 978-0674088467.
- Xiong, Victor Cunrui (2000), Sui-Tang Chang'an: A Study in the Urban History of Late Medieval China (Michigan Monographs in Chinese Studies), U of Michigan Center for Chinese Studies, ISBN 0892641371
- Xiong, Victor Cunrui (2006), Emperor Yang of the Sui Dynasty: His Life, Times, and Legacy, Albany: State University of New York Press, ISBN 978-0791482681.
- Xiong, Victor Cunrui (2009), Historical Dictionary of Medieval China, United States: Scarecrow Press, Inc., ISBN 978-0810860537
- Xu, Elina-Qian (2005), Historical Development of the Pre-Dynastic Khitan, Institute for Asian and African Studies 7
- Xue, Zongzheng (1992), Turkic peoples, 中国社会科学出版社
- Yuan, Shu (2001), 柏楊版通鑑記事本末28第二次宦官時代, Yuǎnliú chūbǎnshìyè gǔfèn yǒuxiàn gōngsī, ISBN 957-32-4273-7
- Yule, Henry (1915), Cathay and the Way Thither: Being a Collection of Medieval Notices of China, Vol I: Preliminary Essay on the Intercourse Between China and the Western Nations Previous to the Discovery of the Cape Route, Hakluyt Society

=== Further reading ===
- Old Book of Tang, vols. 2, 3.
- New Book of Tang, vol. 2.
- Zizhi Tongjian, vols. 182, 183, 184, 185, 186, 187, 188, 189, 190, 191, 192, 193, 194, 195, 196, 197, 198, 199.
- Hirth, Friedrich (2000) [1885]. Arkenberg, Jerome S. (ed.). "East Asian History Sourcebook: Chinese Accounts of Rome, Byzantium and the Middle East, c. 91 B.C.E. – 1643 C.E." Fordham.edu. Fordham University.
- Luttwak, Edward N. (2009). The Grand Strategy of the Byzantine Empire. Cambridge and London: The Belknap Press of Harvard University Press. ISBN 978-0-674-03519-5.
- Schafer, Edward H. (1985) [1963], The Golden Peaches of Samarkand: A study of T'ang Exotics (1st paperback ed.), Berkeley and Los Angeles: University of California Press, ISBN 0-520-05462-8.
- Twitchett, Dennis, ed. (1979). The Cambridge History of China, Volume 3: Sui and T'ang China, 589–906 AD, Part 1. Cambridge: Cambridge University Press. ISBN 978-0-521-21446-9. See especially : Ch. 4, T'ai-tsung (626–49) the Consolidator. pp. 150–241.
- Yule, Henry (1915). Henri Cordier (ed.), Cathay and the Way Thither: Being a Collection of Medieval Notices of China, Vol I: Preliminary Essay on the Intercourse Between China and the Western Nations Previous to the Discovery of the Cape Route. London: Hakluyt Society. Accessed 21 September 2016.

Emperor Taizong of Tang House of Li Born: 28 January 598 Died: 10 July 649
Regnal titles
Preceded by Emperor Gaozu of Tang	Emperor of China (most regions); Tang; 626–649	Succeeded by Emperor Gaozong of Tang
Preceded by Liang Shidu (Emperor of Liang)	Emperor of China (northern Shaanxi/western Inner Mongolia); 628–649	Succeeded by Emperor Gaozong of Tang
