= Princess Jinyang =

Tang dynasty princess (633–644)

Princess Jinyang 晋阳公主
- Born: 633
- Died: January 1, 644 (aged 10–11)
Names
- Family name: Li; Given name: Mingda; Nickname: Sizi (Little Rhino）
- Clan: House of Li
- Father: Emperor Taizong of Tang
- Mother: Empress Zhangsun

Princess Jinyang (Chinese: 晋阳公主), born Li Mingda (Chinese: 李明达; pinyin: Lǐ Míngdá); (633– 644) was a princess of the Tang dynasty, a daughter of Emperor Taizong. She may have been the only princess of China to be raised by the emperor himself, after the death of her mother.

== Biography ==
Li Mingda was the nineteenth daughter of Emperor Taizong of Tang and the third daughter of Empress Zhangsun.

While Empress Zhangsun died on July 28, 636. Li Mingda, being a toddler, was too young to understand her mother's death, and when she was older and learned the truth, she often felt sad about that. She and her brother Li Zhi were both raised by their father Emperor Taizong. When Li Zhi was 14, he had to go to his manor. Li Zhi and Li Mingda did not want to leave each another, which made Emperor Taizong cry

Li Mingda was good at calligraphy. Once she made a replica of her father's work, no one could distinguish which was by her and which was Taizong's original work.

Li Mingda had a similar personality to her mother Empress Zhangsun, being intelligent, tactful and calm. When Emperor Taizong was angry at someone, she would slowly calm him down. Due to this, she was appreciated by the officials.

Li Mingda died at the age 12. When she died, Emperor Taizong was so affected by grief that he did not eat properly for thirty days until he became emaciated. Many ministers tried to encourage him to get better, and Taizong said "Do you think I don't know grief has no benefits? But I can't stop it, and I don't know the reason why." Li Mingda was buried beside a temple.
