= Princess Xincheng =

Chinese princess (634–663)

Unknown
- Princess Xincheng
- Born: 634
- Died: 663
- Spouse: Zhangsun Quan; Wei Zhengju
- Father: Emperor Taizong of Tang
- Mother: Empress Zhangsun

Princess Xincheng (新城公主; 634–663), formerly titled Princess Hengshan, was a royal princess of the Tang dynasty. Her personal name was not recorded. She was the youngest child of Emperor Taizong of Tang and Empress Zhangsun, making her the full younger sister of Emperor Gaozong.

Princess Xincheng was first married to Zhangsun Quan of Henan, a member of the imperial Zhangsun clan. Following his death, she remarried Wei Zhengju of Jingzhao.

== Early life ==
Born in 634 CE, she was the youngest daughter of Emperor Taizong and Empress Zhangsun of the Imperial Li family. Her mother’s health was already declining at the time of her birth, and she died in 636 CE when the princess was only two years old.

On September 23, 642 CE, she was granted the title Princess Hengshan, accompanied by a formal land enfeoffment and an increased stipend. The title was highly unconventional; according to the Six Codes of Tang, noble titles were strictly forbidden from using the names of famous mountains, great rivers, or districts near the capital. By naming her after one of China’s five sacred peaks, the Emperor deliberately broke protocol to signal his immense favor.

In 643 CE, she was betrothed to Wei Shuyu, eldest son of renowned minister Wei Zheng, but the engagement was annulled later that same year.

== Married life ==
In 649 CE, Emperor Taizong arranged a marriage for Princess Hengshan with Zhangsun Quan from the same family as her mother Empress Zhangsun, but Emperor Taizong died and the wedding was postponed for three years due to the Emperor's death and strict mourning rites.

In the 23rd year of the Zhenguan era (649 CE), she married Zhangsun Quan.

On the 23rd day of the 5th month in the 3rd year of Yonghui (4 July 652 CE), her title was changed to Grand Princess of Xincheng. In 659, as the Zhangsun clan was crushed in its power struggle with Empress Wu Zetian, Zhangsun Quan was exiled to Xuzhou and shortly thereafter assassinated by her agents.

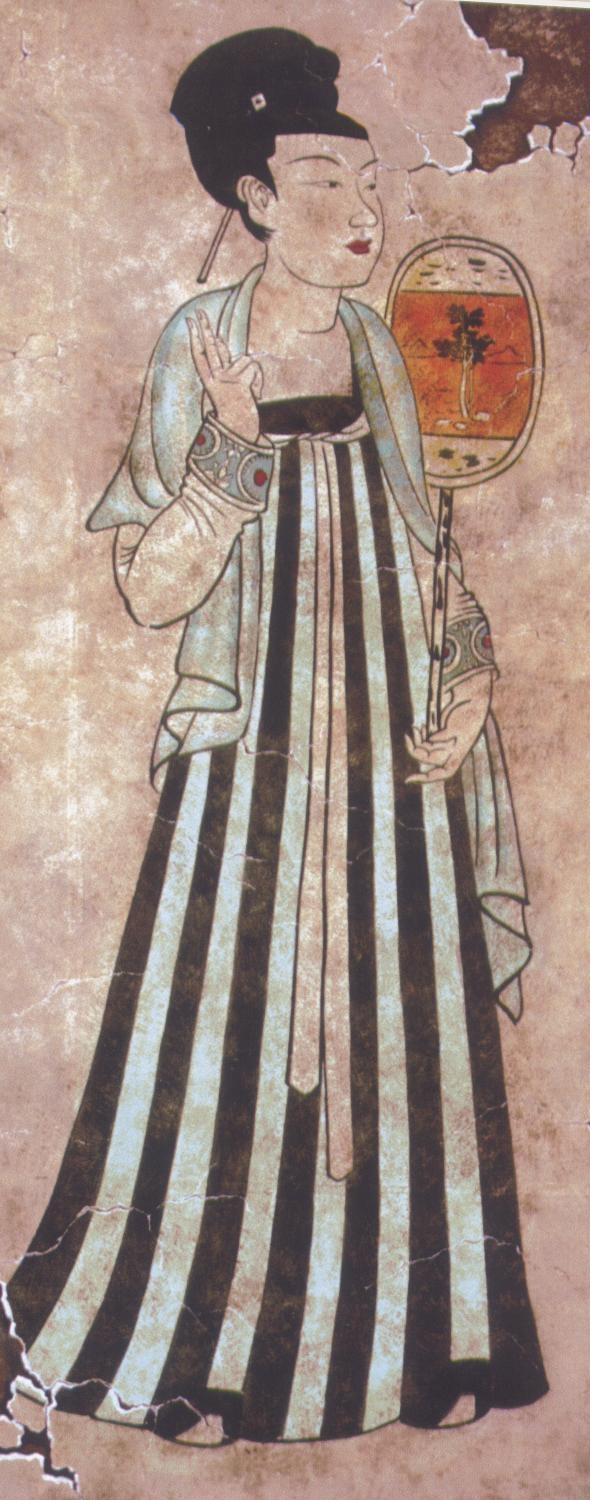
"Princess Xincheng Tomb Mural"

At Princess Dongyang’s recommendation, Grand Princess Xincheng remarried Wei Zhengju. The princess’s proud and headstrong temperament irritated Wei Zhengju, who treated her with cruelty and disrespect, and their marriage was notoriously unhappy.

== Death and Burial ==
Princess Xincheng died suddenly in February 663, at the age of thirty, during the third year of the Longshuo era and cause of her death remains unknown. Contemporary accounts and circumstantial evidence led to suspicion that her husband, Wei Zhengju, was responsible. In January of the following year, Emperor Gaozong, reportedly enraged, issued an edict ordering Wei’s public execution and the exile of the entire Wei clan. He also punished Princess Dongyang, who had arranged the marriage, by banishing her family to Jizhou.

Alternative historical interpretations suggest that Princess Xincheng may have died of illness and that Wei Zhengju was wrongfully executed. This view is partly supported by the fact that Emperor Gaozong later ordered Wei Zhengju to be interred alongside the princess, a practice unlikely to occur if he had been confirmed as her murderer.

Princess Xincheng was buried with the ceremonial honors of an empress, a rare distinction among Tang princesses at Zhaoling, the mausoleum of her father Emperor Taizong. Her tomb is located approximately 1.5 kilometers northwest of the main imperial mound, near Dongping Village in Liquan County, Shaanxi Province.

Archaeological excavations carried out between 1994 and 1995 revealed extensive looting and disarray within the tomb. Notably, all the faces of maidservants in the wall murals had been deliberately scraped off. According to legend, Emperor Gaozong ordered this defacement, holding the attendants accountable for failing to care for the princess properly in her final days.
