= Zhao Mausoleum (Tang dynasty) =

Mausoleum of Chinese Emperor Taizong of Tang

Coordinates: 34.6319°N 108.4833°E

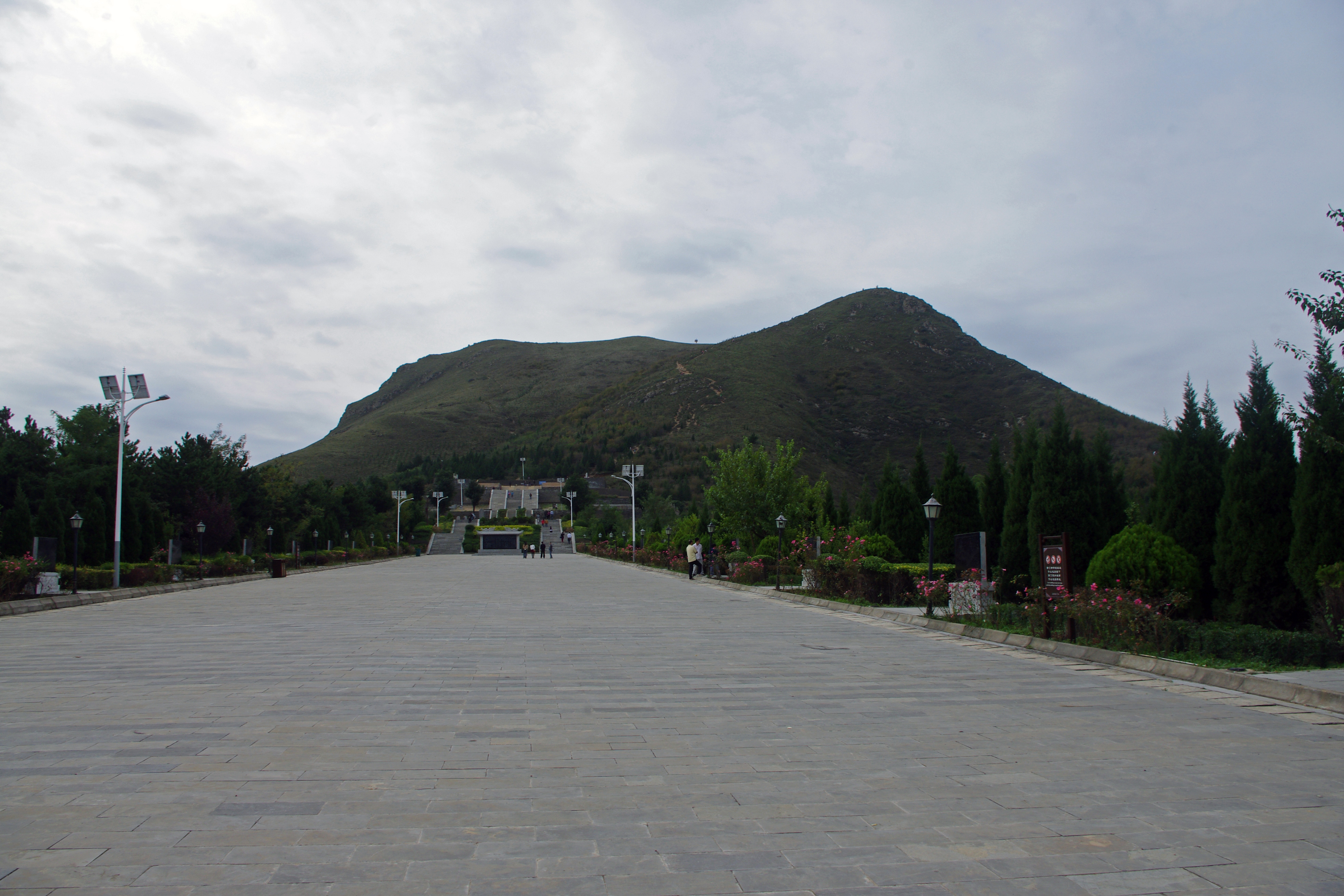
Zhao Mausoleum

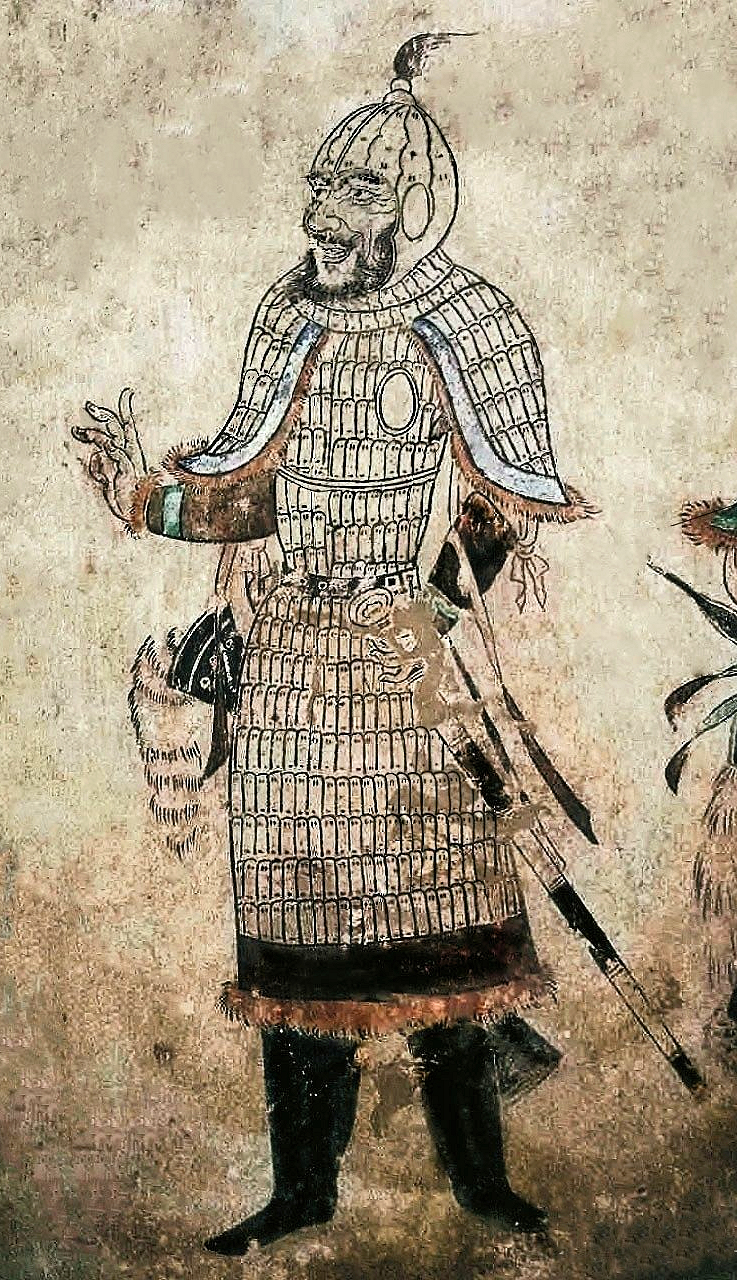
Chinese officer of the Guard of Honour. Tomb of Princess Changle (长乐公主墓), Zhao Mausoleum, Shaanxi province. Tang Zhenguan year 17, i.e. 644 CE

Zhao Mausoleum (昭陵; pinyin: Zhāolíng; "Zhao" means the light rays of the sun) is the largest mausoleum of the Tang dynasty and the tomb of Emperor Taizong of Tang (599–649).

It is located in Jiuzhong Mountain, Shaanxi, China, it is the biggest mausoleum of the Tang dynasty. Besides being the final resting place of Emperor Taizong of Tang it also has an additional 200 tombs of royals and high-ranked officials accompanied around.

The famous stone reliefs Six Steeds of Zhao Mausoleum are exhibited in the Stele Forest Museum of Xi'an (4 steeds) and Museum of the University of Pennsylvania, U.S. (2 steeds) separately. They were most likely designed by the court painter and administrator Yan Liben, who is recorded as making other works for the mausoleum, and may have designed the mausoleum itself.

Planning and designing began in 636, after the death of the Empress Zhangsun, who requested a simple burial.

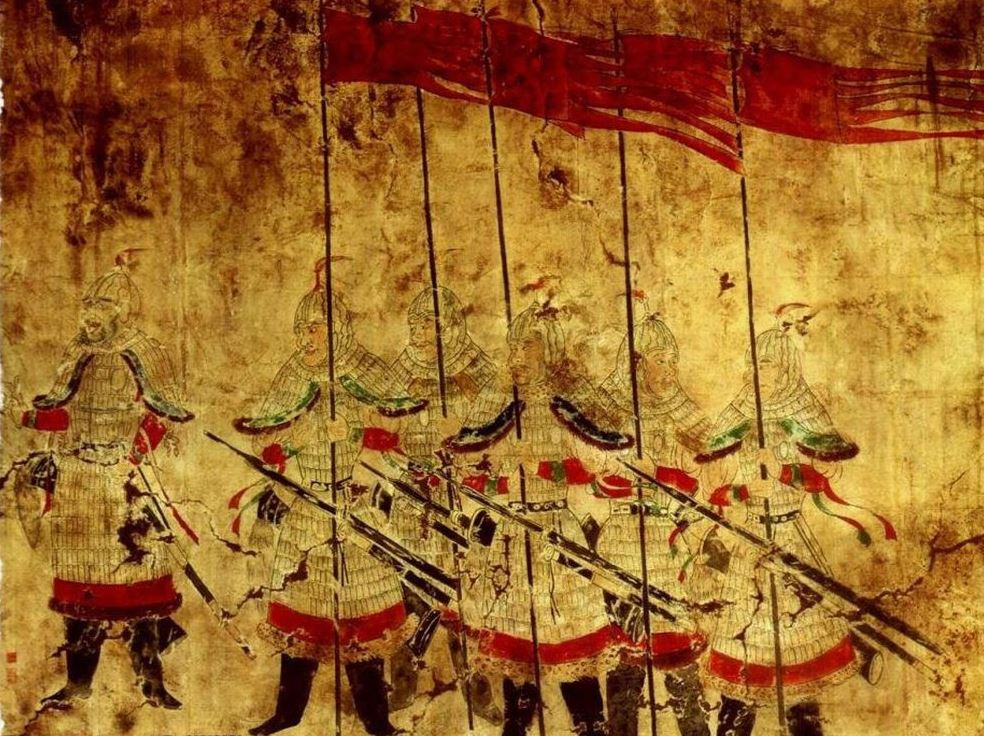
Elite Honour Guards of Princess Changle

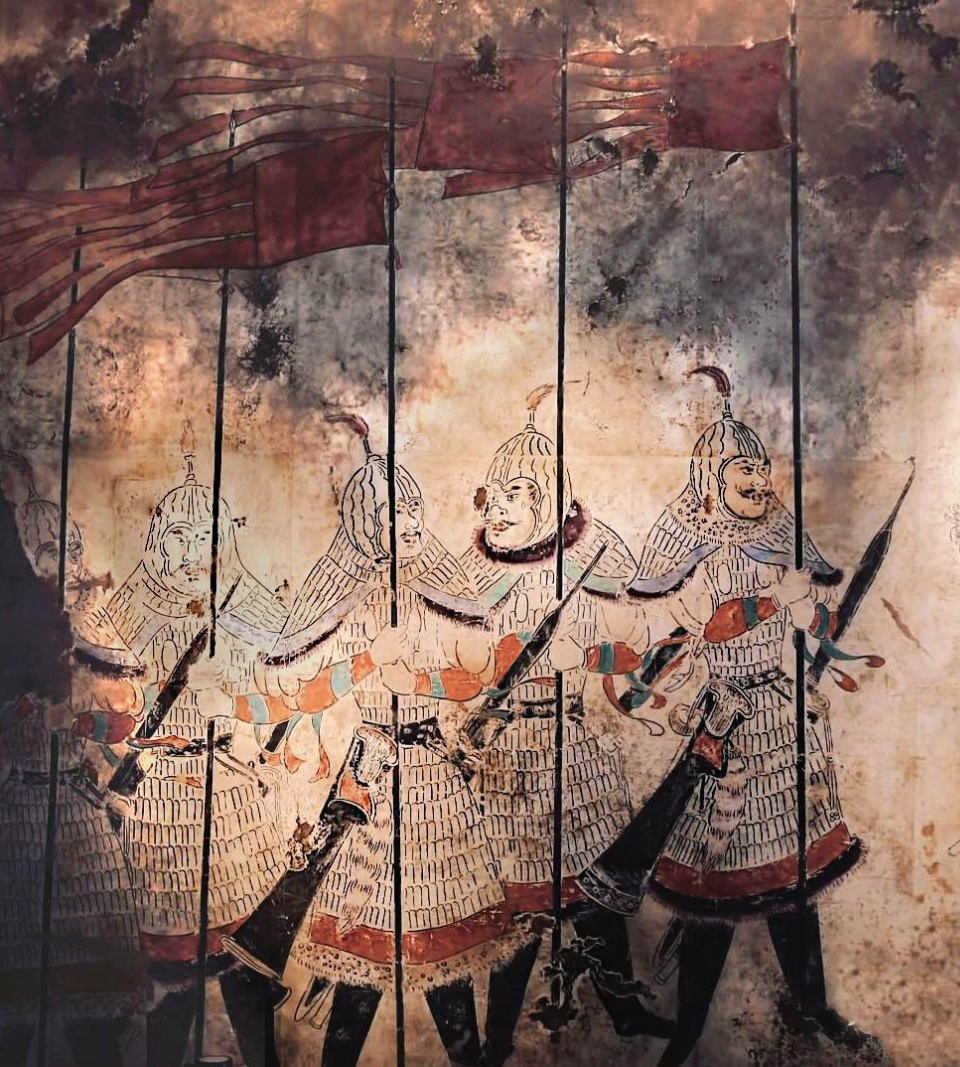
Tang Elite Guard units

The Zhao Mausoleum also shows many paintings of the Tang Imperial guards and officers, all of which are elite soldiery.

== See also ==
- List of mausoleums
- Qianling Mausoleum
