= Empress Zhangsun =

Empress of Tang China from 626 to 636

Empress consort of the Tang dynasty
- Tenure: 16 September 626 (Note: The Zizhi Tongjian and Taizong's biographies in both Books of Tang recorded that Lady Zhangsun was made empress on the bingzi day of the eighth month of the ninth year of the Wude era of Tang Gaozu's reign. This date corresponds to 16 Sep 626 on the Gregorian calendar.) – 28 July 636
- Born: 15 March 601; Chang'an, Sui China
- Died: 28 July 636 (aged 35); Chang'an, Tang China
- Burial: Zhaoling
- Spouse: Emperor Taizong of Tang
- Issue: Li Chengqian, Prince Min of Hengshan; Li Tai, Prince Gong of Pu; Li Zhi, Emperor Gaozong; Li Lize, Princess Changle; Princess Chengyang; Li Mingda, Princess Jinyang; Princess Xincheng
Posthumous name
- Empress Wendeshunsheng (文德順聖皇后; "the civil, virtuous, serene, and holy empress") (Note: There are conflicting records on when Empress Zhangsun was given this posthumous name. Vol.03 of Tang Huiyao recorded that she was given this posthumous name in the 6th month of the 8th year of the Tianbao era of the reign of Emperor Xuanzong of Tang (which corresponds to 20 Jun to 18 Jul 749 in the Julian calendar). Empress Zhangsun's biography in Old Book of Tang recorded that she was given this posthumous name in the 8th month of the 1st year of the Shangyuan era of the reign of Emperor Suzong of Tang (which corresponds to 14 Sep to 13 Oct 760 in the Julian calendar); Emperor Xuanzong's biography in the same work recorded that the posthumous name was given on the bingyin day of the leap month of the same year as recorded in Tang Huiyao (corresponding to 22 Jul 749). Zhangsun's biography in New Book of Tang only recorded that she was given this posthumous name during the Shangyuan era, while Emperor Xuanzong's biography in the same work recorded that various emperors and empresses were given updated posthumous names on the same date as recorded in his biography in Old Book of Tang.)
- Father: Zhangsun Sheng
- Mother: Lady Gao

Empress Zhangsun (長孫皇后, personal name unknown, presumably Wugou (無垢)) (15 March 601 (Note: Empress Zhangsun's biography in Old Book of Tang indicate that she was 36 (by East Asian reckoning) when she died. Thus, her birth year should be 601 (first year of the Renshou era of the reign of Emperor Wen of Sui). Separately, the Tang Hui Yao recorded that on the sixth day of the second month of the first year of the Longshuo era of Tang Gaozong's reign, the Court of Imperial Sacrifices was ordered to stop practising their music for six days, as it was an anniversary related to Empress Zhangsun. Since Empress Zhangsun's death date was recorded, this anniversary should then be referring to her birthday. The sixth day of the second month of the first year of the Renshou era corresponds to 15 Mar 601 in the Julian calendar.) – 28 July 636 (Note: The Zizhi Tongjian recorded that Zhangsun died on the jimao day in the sixth month of the tenth year of the Zhenguan era of Tang Taizong's reign. This date corresponds to 28 Jul 636 in the Julian calendar. Emperor Taizong's biographies in both Books of Tang also recorded the same death date.)), formally Empress Wendeshunsheng (文德順聖皇后, literally "the civil, virtuous, serene, and holy empress") or, in short, Empress Wende (文德皇后), was a Chinese essayist and an empress of the Chinese Tang dynasty. She was the wife of Emperor Taizong and the mother of Emperor Gaozong. She was well educated, and her ancestors were of Xianbei ethnicity. Their original surname was Tuoba, later changed to Zhangsun. During her tenure as empress, she served as a loyal assistant and honest advisor to her husband, Emperor Taizong.

== Background ==
The future Empress Zhangsun was born on 15 March 601. Her father was the Sui dynasty general Zhangsun Sheng (長孫晟), and her mother was Zhangsun Sheng's wife Lady Gao, the daughter of the official Gao Jingde (高敬德). (Note: While historical records clearly state that Lady Gao was Zhangsun Sheng's wife, she might have not been his first wife, as while it was possible that Empress Zhangsun's older brother Zhangsun Anye, who was said to have expelled Zhangsun Wuji and Empress Zhangsun from the Zhangsun household, could have done so merely on pure strength, he might not have otherwise had the authority to do so had his mother not also have been a wife (i.e., a wife who died prior to Zhangsun Sheng's marriage to Lady Gao) rather than a concubine.) She had at least four older brothers—Zhangsun Sheng's oldest son Zhangsun Xingbu (長孫行布, who was killed in 604 while resisting the rebellion of Emperor Yang of Sui's brother Yang Liang the Prince of Han), Zhangsun Heng'an (長孫恆安), Zhangsun Anye (長孫安業), and Zhangsun Wuji. (Note: Zhangsun Wuji was also born of Lady Gao, while Zhangsun Anye was not; who Zhangsun Xingbu's and Zhangsun Heng'an's mothers were was not recorded in history.) Zhangsun Sheng died in 609, and Zhangsun Anye, instead of raising his younger brother and sister, expelled them, as well as his stepmother Lady Gao, from the Zhangsun household and sent them back to Lady Gao's brother Gao Shilian, and Gao Shilian raised them. The future Empress Zhangsun was said to be studious and proper in her actions. In 613, she married Li Shimin, the second son of the general Li Yuan the Duke of Tang. Li Shimin was 15, and she was 13 (both ages are by East Asian reckoning).

It was written that the ancestors of Zhangsun family traced their origin to the Xianbei dynasty Northern Wei's founding emperor Emperor Taiwu of Northern Wei's 17th generation ancestor Tuoba Kuaili (拓跋儈立) — that their ancestor was Tuoba Kuali's third son, who took the surname Baba (拔拔), eventually changed to Zhangsun when Emperor Xiaowen of Northern Wei changed Xianbei surnames to Han surnames in 496. (Note: Zhangsun Wuji's biography in the Old Book of Tang actually wrote that the Zhangsuns traced their ancestry to the "third older brother of Emperor Xianwen of Northern Wei." See Old Book of Tang, vol. 65. However, this appeared to be in error, as Emperor Xianwen was the oldest son of his father, Emperor Wencheng of Northern Wei, and thus could not have had a third older brother. Based on the Book of Wei, the reference appeared to be intended to "the third older brother of Emperor Xian of Northern Wei," Emperor Xian being the posthumous honor conferred by Emperor Taiwu on Tuoba Kuali's son and successor Tuoba Linli (拓拔鄰立). See Book of Wei, vols. 1, 113.) (Note: The biography of Zhangsun's uncle Zhangsun Chi in Book of Sui recorded that he (and by extension his brother, Zhangsun Sheng) was a great-grandson of Zhangsun Zhi; Zhangsun Zhi has a biography in vol.25 of Book of Wei, and vol.22 of History of the Northern Dynasties (where he was renamed "You" due to his name sounding similar to Emperor Gaozong's real name).)

== As Princess of Qin and crown princess ==
In 617, Li Yuan, aided by Li Shimin and his older brother Li Jiancheng, among others, rebelled at Taiyuan (太原, in modern Taiyuan, Shanxi), and later that year captured the capital Chang'an, declaring Emperor Yang's grandson Yang You the Prince of Dai emperor (as Emperor Gong). In 618, after news arrived that Emperor Yang had been killed in a coup at Jiangdu (江都, in modern Yangzhou, Jiangsu) led by the general Yuwen Huaji, Li Yuan had Yang You yield the throne to him, thus establishing the Tang dynasty. Li Yuan became the first Tang ruler, Emperor Gaozu. He appointed his son, Li Shimin, as the Prince of Qin, his wife as the Princess of Qin. The couple would eventually have three sons – Li Chengqian, Li Tai, and Li Zhi – and at least three daughters, who were later named the Princesses Changle, Jinyang, and Xincheng.

Li Shimin was Tang's most capable general in its campaigns to reunite China following Sui's collapse, defeating the major enemies Xue Rengao the Emperor of Qin, Liu Wuzhou the Dingyang Khan, Wang Shichong the Emperor of Zheng, and Dou Jiande the Prince of Xia. In doing so, he overshadowed his older brother Li Jiancheng, the crown prince. The brothers developed an intense rivalry. Princess Zhangsun was said to serve her father-in-law Emperor Gaozu carefully, forming friendships with his concubines which she would use to cover up the mistakes of her husband and his faction.

Sources state that in 626, the crown prince Li Jiancheng and another brother, Li Yuanji the Prince of Qi, who supported Li Jiancheng, set out to ambush the rising Li Shimin. But Li Shimin heard about this trap, and organized a counter-coup, walking into the trap with several of his own most trusted and skilled soldiers. When Li Shimin mobilized his personal troops within his mansion, and as he did so, Princess Zhangsun was said to have personally made an appearance before the troops to encourage them. Her brother Zhangsun Wuji was one of Li Shimin's major strategists in this matter. Li Shimin was able to counter Li Jiancheng and Li Yuanji at Xuanwu Gate and kill them, and then essentially forced Emperor Gaozu to appoint him crown prince. Princess Zhangsun was accordingly named crown princess. Two months later, on 4 September, (Note: The Zizhi Tongjian recorded that Taizong assumed the throne on the jiazi day of the eighth month of the ninth year of the Wude era of Tang Gaozu's reign. This date corresponds to 4 Sep 626 on the Gregorian calendar. While Gaozu's and Taizong's biographies in New Book of Tang recorded the same coronation date as Tongjian, their biographies in Old Book of Tang recorded the coronation date as the guihai day of the same month and year, i.e. the day before (3 Sep 626). Tongjian recorded that on that day, Gaozu attempted to cede the throne to Taizong; the latter declined to accept.) Emperor Gaozu yielded the throne to Li Shimin, who took the throne as Emperor Taizong. Princess Zhangsun, consequently, became empress, and their oldest son, Li Chengqian, became crown prince.

== As empress ==
As empress, Empress Zhangsun was said to be frugal and not wasteful, taking only the supplies that she needed without living luxuriously. When Li Chengqian's wet nurse the Lady Sui'an stated that his palace lacked sufficient goods and requested more, she replied, "All a crown prince should worry about is not having enough virtues or enough fame. Why worry about not having enough goods?" It was also said that she rarely got angry with the ladies in waiting and eunuchs who served her. She often gave Emperor Taizong examples from history to inspire him to rule better, and if there was a problem with the decision of Emperor Taizong about the administration, or for the officials and officers, she respectfully asked him to change the decision. Her influence over him was such that she interceded on behalf of condemned criminals and changed his harmful decisions with gentle counsel. One time, when Emperor Taizong got angry at a servant, she pretended to be angry as well and asked to personally interrogate them and hold them in custody; she then waited until his anger had subsided, and then begin to plead on their behalf, thus reducing improper punishments within the palace. It was said that whenever Emperor Taizong's concubines would be ill, she would personally visit them and reduce her own expenditures to treat them. When one of Emperor Taizong's concubines died giving birth to a daughter, Empress Zhangsun raised the daughter, Princess Yuzhang, as her own.

Emperor Taizong always loved Empress Zhangsun. After ascending the throne, he often showed more favor to the Empress family than allowed. Because of Empress Zhangsun, he granted extrajudicial favors to Zhangsun Anye, Zhangsun Shunde, and Zhangsun Chang for their illegal acts, and he lavishly gave gifts, grants and wealth to all empress relatives and friends to such an extent that many courtiers even the empress herself and some of her relatives objected to it. Emperor Taizong would at times try to discuss with empress matters of award and punishment and the suggestions of the officials on important matters and even confidential government information to see what she opined, but each time she refused to do so, stating that it was not her place to do so. She replied to him, "The crowing of hens in the morning is a sign of family trouble. As a woman, how dare I be informed of government affairs and give an opinion about it?"; However, Taizong's insistence forced her to tell him what she thought. As her brother Zhangsun Wuji was a major strategist who contributed much to his victory over Li Jiancheng, he wanted to make Zhangsun Wuji a chancellor, and Empress Zhangsun declined on Zhangsun Wuji's behalf, stating:

I have the opportunity to be here in the palace, reaching the highest of honors. I do not wish to see my brothers and nephews wield power. What happened to the households of Han dynasty's Empress Lü Zhi, Huo Guang and Shangguan Jie are cruel examples of what might happen. I pray that Your Imperial Majesty will not make my brother chancellor.

Emperor Taizong initially disagreed and made Zhangsun Wuji chancellor anyway on 18 August 627, but with Zhangsun Wuji himself also repeatedly declining, Emperor Taizong relented on 13 February 628 (Note: While Taizong's biography in New Book of Tang recorded the same date of dismissal, his biography in Old Book of Tang dated the dismissal to the xinchou day of the same month and year (no corresponding date in the Julian calendar).) and removed Zhangsun Wuji from the chancellor position.

Also in 627, Empress Zhangsun's other brother Zhangsun Anye was implicated in a treasonous plot, along with the generals Li Xiaochang (李孝常), Liu Deyu (劉德裕), and Yuan Hongshan (元弘善). Initially, Zhangsun Anye, like the other conspirators, were to be put to death, but Empress Zhangsun interceded on his behalf, stating that even though Zhangsun Anye deserved death, the people would have thought that she was retaliating for his ill treatment of her and Zhangsun Wuji when they were little. Emperor Taizong agreed and spared Zhangsun Anye, only exiling him to Xi Prefecture (巂州, roughly modern Liangshan Yi Autonomous Prefecture, Sichuan).

In 632, Emperor Taizong was about to marry the Princess Changle to Zhangsun Wuji's son Zhangsun Chong (長孫沖). As the princess was born of Empress Zhangsun and was his favorite daughter, Emperor Taizong ordered that her dowry had to exceed that for his sister, the Princess Yongjia. The chancellor Wei Zheng advised against it, pointing out that this was contrary to Emperor Ming of Han's observation that his sons should not be as honored as his brothers. Emperor Taizong agreed and also informed Empress Zhangsun, who was greatly impressed with Wei's honest advice, and therefore, after receiving permission from Emperor Taizong, she had her eunuchs send rewards of money and silk to Wei, praising him for his honesty. On another occasion, after Emperor Taizong returned from an imperial gathering, he was angry and yelled, "Let me find a chance to kill this country-bumpkin!" Empress Zhangsun asked whom he was referring to, and he replied, "I am referring to Wei Zheng. He always finds a way to insult me in front of everyone in the imperial hall!" Empress Zhangsun retreated to her bedchambers and put on the official empress gown; standing solemnly, she prepared to bow to Emperor Taizong. He was surprised, and asked her what the reason was. She responded, "I have heard that only a most able emperor will have subordinates who have integrity. Wei shows this much integrity because you are an able emperor. How can I not congratulate you?" Emperor Taizong's anger turned to happiness, and he did not punish Wei. Later that year, on an occasion when Emperor Taizong and she personally visited Emperor Gaozu (who had then taken the title of Taishang Huang (retired emperor)) at his Da'an Palace (大安宮), they personally served a feast to him.

Emperor Taizong, for several years, had often suffered from severe illnesses, and Empress Zhangsun often attended to him day and night, carrying poison within her belt and resolving to commit suicide if the emperor should die. Empress Zhangsun herself was said to suffer from severe asthma, and her conditions were exacerbated in 634 when she was ill, but nevertheless attended to Emperor Taizong when he was forced to wake up in the middle of the night and put on armor and weapons due to an emergency report by his brother-in-law, Chai Shao (柴紹) the Duke of Qiao. By 636, her conditions were severe, and Li Chengqian suggested to her that, as the doctors appeared to have done everything they could, Emperor Taizong declare a general pardon and encourage commoners to become Buddhist or Taoist monks, to try to gain divine favor. Empress Zhangsun, knowing that Emperor Taizong had long disapproved of Buddhism and Taoism and herself believing overuse of pardons to be improper, refused. Li Chengqian instead told the idea to the chancellor Fang Xuanling, who reported it to Emperor Taizong. Emperor Taizong considered issuing a general pardon, but Empress Zhangsun again refused. As she came close to death (at a time that Fang had drawn anger from Emperor Taizong and was temporarily relieved of his post and returned to his mansion), she bid Emperor Taizong goodbye with these words;

Fang Xuanling has served Your Imperial Majesty for a long time. He is careful, and all of his wonderful strategies and secret plans were not revealed to anyone. Unless there is a particularly good reason, I hope that you will not abandon him. As to my Zhangsun clan, many of them enjoy high salaries and high positions on account of our marriage, not because of their great virtues, and therefore they can crumble easily. In order to preserve the Zhangsuns, I hope that you will not put them in powerful positions, and that they would be satisfied with seeing you at imperial gatherings the first and 15th day of each month. During my lifetime, I made no contributions to the people, and I should not harm them in my death. I hope that you will not build a tomb to cause the people to labor and the empire to waste resources. Make a hill my tomb, and only use brick or wooden implements in the tomb. I hope that Your Imperial Majesty will continue to be close to honest men and stay away from those lacking virtues; that you will accept faithful words and reject wicked flattery; that you will decrease labor and stop hunting. Even as I go into the underworld, if these things happen, I will have no regrets. It is not necessary to summon the sons and daughters back here; if I see them mourn and cry, I will only be saddened.

She died in 636. After she died, the palace authorities submitted Empress Zhangsun's writings—a 10-volume compilation of the good deeds of ancient women titled Examples for Women (女則, Nü Ze), and a commentary criticizing Han dynasty's Empress Ma – to Emperor Taizong. When Emperor Taizong read her works, he was greatly saddened, and he stated:

This book, written by the empress, is capable of being an example to generations. It is not that I do not know the will of heaven and mourn uselessly, but now, when I enter the palace, I can no longer hear her corrective words. I have lost a wonderful help, and I cannot forget her.

He summoned Fang back to his chancellor position, and then he buried her with honors due an empress, but reduced the expenditures as much as possible, as she wished. He himself would eventually be buried at the same tomb, after his own death in 649.

== Issue ==
Empress Zhangsun produced seven children with Emperor Taizong:

- Sons
  - Li Chengqian (619-5 January 645), Crown Prince (created 627, deposed 643), posthumously Prince Min of Hengshan
  - Li Zhi, Emperor Gaozong of Tang (21 July 628,– 27 December 683), formerly Crown Prince (created 643), formerly Prince of Jin (created 631)
  - Li Tai (618-15 December 652), Prince Gong of Pu
- Daughters
  - Li Lizhi, the Princess Changle
  - Princess Chengyang
  - Li Mingda, the Princess Jinyang
  - Princess Xincheng

== In popular culture ==
Consort Chen is portrayed by Hong Kong actress Margie Tsang in TVB's 1987 series The Grand Canal (大運河)

Chinese royalty
Preceded by None (dynasty founded)	Empress of the Tang dynasty 626–636	Succeeded by Empress Wang
Preceded by Empress Xiao of the Sui dynasty	Empress of China (most regions); 626–636	Succeeded by Empress Wang
Preceded by Empress Cao of Xia	Empress of China (Hebei); 626–636	Succeeded by Empress Wang
Preceded by Empress Ju of Dingyang	Empress of China (Shanxi); 626–636	Succeeded by Empress Wang
Preceded by Empress Ju of Qin	Empress of China (Eastern Gansu); 626–636	Succeeded by Empress Wang
