= C. T. Loo =

Chinese-born art dealer (1880–1957)

C.T. Loo
- 盧芹齋
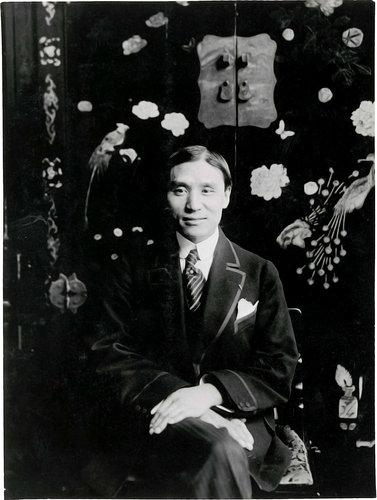
- C.T. Loo in the 1910s
- Born: 盧焕文 Lu Huanwen; 1 February 1880; Lujiadou (盧家兜), Zhejiang, China
- Died: 15 August 1957 (aged 77); Nyon, Switzerland
- Other name: Ching Tsai Loo
- Occupation: Art dealer

Ching Tsai Loo, commonly known as C. T. Loo (Chinese: 盧芹齋; pinyin: Lú Qínzhāi; 1 February 1880 – August 15, 1957), was a controversial art dealer of Chinese origin who maintained galleries in Paris and New York and supplied important pieces for collectors and American museums by illegally exporting a large amount of significant state cultural relics from China. He has been called "the preeminent dealer of Chinese art and artifacts for the first half of the twentieth century," but also criticized for his illegal active role in removing antiques and archaeological treasures from China for sale to western collectors.

== Early life ==
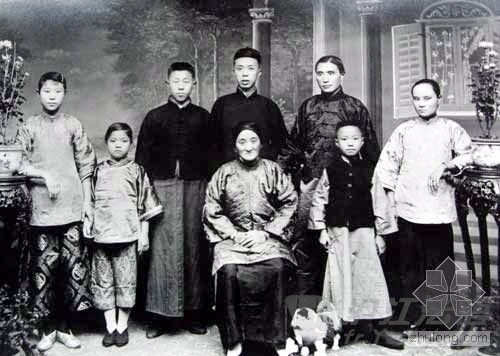
Lu Family c. 1900. C.T. Loo is in the rear, second from right

He was born Lu Huanwen in Lujiadou (盧家兜, Lu Family Ford), a village in Huzhou, Zhejiang, China, some 300 kilometres (190 mi) west of Shanghai. His family had lived in this single-surname village since the 10th century. Orphaned at age ten, he was raised by his uncle, but he decided as a teenager to try his luck in Nanxun, a center of the silk trade. He did well working under Zhang Baoshan, a successful merchant, whose son, Zhang Renjie, was appointed to the Chinese Embassy in France. Loo accompanied Zhang to Paris in 1902 at the age of 22. Few Chinese were living in France at that time, but Zhang Renjie invited Loo to work as doorman at his teahouse and then in his family Chinese goods import business, the gallery Ton-ying, in the Place de la Madeleine. Zhang used his connections in China to obtain antiques and works of art for the company. On his return to China, Zhang became an early financial backer of Chiang Kai-shek.

== Career and influence as an art dealer ==
When Loo arrived in Paris, he wore the traditional Chinese gown and sported a queue, but soon became a Parisian dandy. He thrived in Zhang's store but felt constrained. Profits were not reinvested but instead used for the anti-Manchu revolutionary activities of his boss, who subsidized a circle of Chinese philosophical anarchists. In 1908, Loo, now dressed in elegant Parisian fashion and calling himself Cheng-Tsai Loo (Lu Qinzhai), opened his own store on Rue Taitbout under the name "Laiyuan and Company" with branches soon to open in Beijing and Shanghai. Loo realized that Westerners preferred later works such as Qing dynasty three-color porcelains, which he could supply in good quantities because of the political ties he formed. A friend remarked on Loo's sources in China: "being in touch with important people... he was able to know of precious works of art which had been hidden from the storms of many revolutions."

Loo's timing was good. The reports of the French archaeological mission on the Central Asian caves at Dunhuang made the taste for Chinese things fashionable, and Loo supplied high-quality works to fit the new tastes. He developed scholarly understanding and expanded public taste in Asian art, particularly sculpture and early jades, by becoming friends with such eminent Sinologists as Edouard Chavannes, Victor Segalen, and especially Paul Pelliot, director of the Dunhuang expedition, whom he commissioned to write catalogs (as he did later with Berthold Laufer in the United States). The outbreak of war of 1914, however, meant that he could no longer travel to and from China through Siberia but was forced to return by way of the United States. He discovered a growing market for Chinese art in New York and decided to establish a new branch there in 1915. The move from war-torn Europe to the New World was prescient, since the United States became the dominant importer of Chinese antiquities from 1916 to 1931.

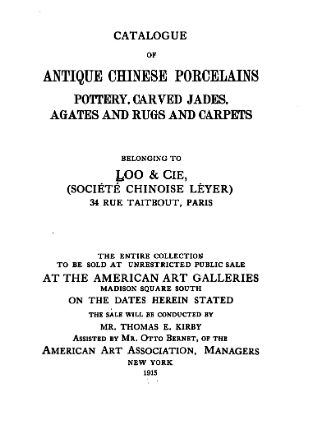
Title page of Loo's first New York exhibition catalogue

Once established in galleries on Fifth Avenue, Loo's charm and connections in China proved effective and profitable. Loo, observes one recent scholar, lived in one of the most vigorous growth periods for the Asian art market. Wealthy collectors were learning about Asian art, as were well-endowed museums such as the Metropolitan Museum of Art in New York, the Museum of Fine Arts, in Boston, and the Freer Gallery in Washington, D.C. In Europe, interest in collecting art from the Orient was such that the major dealers, such as Loo, the Duveen brothers, and the Japanese dealer Yamanaka & Co., could hold exhibitions almost every year, sometimes both in New York and in Paris or London. Loo worked hard to establish personal relations with American museum directors and collectors. Between 1915 and 1917, he offered gifts to at least six museums. In July 1917, for instance, Loo wrote a postcard from Beijing to George Byron, director of the University of Pennsylvania museum, "Will write you if I have seen some fine things suitable for your honorable museum." Works which he sold to museums and collectors at this time are on display at the Freer Gallery, the Fogg Museum, and the Museum of Fine Arts, among others, including the Yixian luohans, two relief panels depicting Emperor Taizong's horses, and a Sui dynasty altarpiece from the collection of the imperial collector Duanfang.

After the end of the war in 1919, Loo found himself competing with dealers such as Duveen for the attention of collectors. A revealing transaction took place in 1921. Loo offered what he thought to be a Tang dynasty bronze head of Guanyin to John D. Rockefeller, III for $40,000. Rockefeller, perhaps concerned that dealers would want to take advantage of his wealth, declined, offering $25,000. After further bargaining led nowhere, Loo sold the piece to University of Pennsylvania Museum for $40,000. Loo continued his attempts to develop a relation with the Rockefellers, however, hosting them in his Paris "pagoda," though they bought little of consequence from him. The decade long boom in Chinese art came to a close with the Crash of 1929, and by 1931, the volume of China's antique trade with the United States had fallen to about half what it had been in 1926.

The years up to 1941 saw a change in the nature of Loo's market as tastes changed. In the West, the study of Asia and Asian art became more professional as museums acquired curators to deepen and widen their collections and universities developed graduate programs. In China, the beleaguered Chinese government viewed traveling exhibitions which visited the West as a way to promote China's image, and Chinese art became an occasion for national pride. Loo's business reached its peak in the second half of the 1930s as he adapted to a more sophisticated market, expanding his international art network to England, France, Germany, and America. Between 1933 and 1941 Loo launched at least one important exhibition or publication project every year. He continued to make major sales to his earlier museum clients, especially of bronzes and sculpture. Loo was instrumental in building the collections of the Nelson Gallery in Kansas City, whose organizer, Laurence Sickman, became a good friend. A series of catalogs and scholarly indexes displayed Loo's knowledge and experience. Among his most successful exhibitions was Three Thousand Years of Chinese Jade, held in 1939 in New York as a fund raiser for China's wartime refugees. The war in China, however, made it nearly impossible to find or export artwork, especially the sculptures Loo so admired. Another problem for Loo was that many of his early clients either died or lost interest.

One new client whose interest grew was Eli Lilly, an Indiana pharmaceutical executive who assembled the basic works for the Asian collection of what became the Indianapolis Museum of Art. In 1947 Loo offered Lilly a group of Song dynasty ceramics for $54,350 which he had listed in his 1941 catalog for roughly half that price. Lilly, perhaps reasoning that Loo should have lowered, not raised, the price for works which had not sold, offered $40,000. After an exchange of correspondence which did not bring the sides together, Loo shipped the pieces to the museum and went himself to Indianapolis, bringing with him five further pieces. When Lilly agreed to pay the original asking price, Loo compromised by including the extra pieces. All are now in the museum.

After 1949, the new Communist government gained control of China and cut Loo off from his sources. Some of Loo's associates were arrested, and Loo's nephew, who had been his agent there, escaped to Hong Kong. In 1950, Loo was forced to liquidate much of his stock, leaving the business to his long-time colleague and successor, Frank Caro.

== Controversies over Loo's export of Chinese art ==
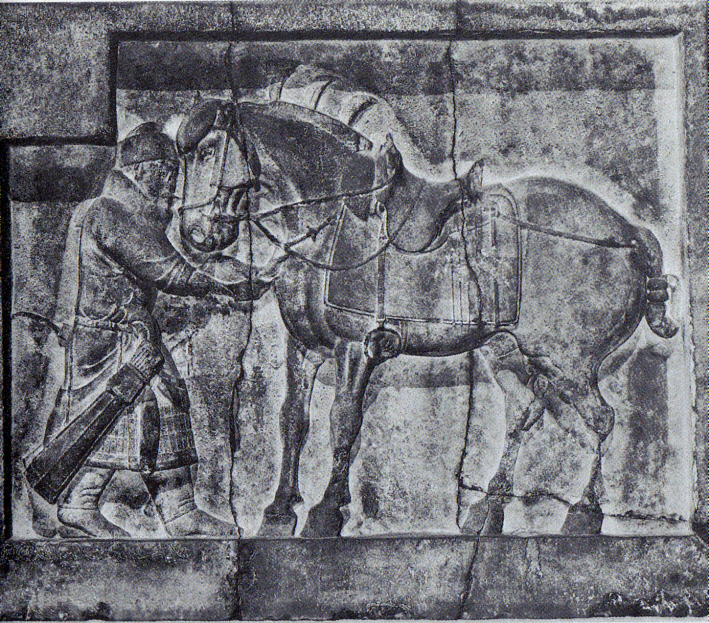
Saluzi, one of the Six Steeds of Zhao Mausoleum, sculpted relief showing horses of Emperor Taizong of Tang, sold to the University of Pennsylvania Museum by C.T. Loo in 1918

The fall of the Qing dynasty in 1911 weakened government supervision of antiquities and coincided with a growth of Western interest in them. Loo created a chain of middlemen who were on the lookout for items they thought he might buy, not only from now impoverished families, but also from imperial tombs, monuments, and monasteries.

Loo sometimes suggested that the objects he had acquired belonged to nobody. He reported that an early Zhou bronze was "accidentally discovered" by a friend of Loo's who was digging a well for a new house. His name has been "notoriously" associated with two of the Six Steeds of Zhao Mausoleum, a set of relief panels depicting the favorite horses of Taizong, the founder of the Tang dynasty, among the most important Chinese sculpture pieces outside of China. Loo sold these two panels to the University of Pennsylvania Museum in the late 1910s and the early 1920s for $125,000. Loo later wrote that two tombs discovered in 1924 contained archaic jades, and that he was "able to secure" the whole collection. Jades discovered in tombs at Jincun, Henan, in 1928–29 were "superb" and "thanks to an expert buyer that we had stationed in the village, we were able to secure nearly everything that came from these tombs, and most of them are now in the Winthrop collection at the Fogg Museum." Others are in the Freer Gallery.

Loo also arranged for a group of Buddhist sculptures to be removed from Xiangtangshan Caves in Hebei, North China. When they could not find a buyer in China, Loo shipped them to Paris, where they again did not find buyers. When these efforts had failed, he finally shipped them to the United States, where the Philadelphia Museum and Charles Freer bought significant works for prices which now seem quite low. (Chinese regulations and Western museum practices now promote protection of such cultural treasures.)

These transactions continue to offend some Chinese. Xu Jian, professor of history at Sun Yat-sen University in Guangzhou, says, "Loo directly and strongly stimulated China's tomb-robbing activities." Géraldine Lenain, author of a biographical study of Loo, says emotions in China are "still very cruel, still very intense", and he's "considered a criminal, the biggest criminal of all." Daisy Wang (Wang Yiyou), author of a doctoral dissertation on Loo's career as a dealer, told an interviewer that Loo served as "an exotic Chinese servant for his rich and powerful Euro-American clientele ... based on America's capitalist and imperialist logic that Chinese antiquities were to be consumed by the rich and the powerful in modern America," not in China.

Loo recognized the feeling against him. His introduction to the catalog for his liquidation sale in 1950 noted: "No matter which object I exported from my country, they were all bought openly on the market, in competition with others." He continued: "I am happy today that these objets d'art that I exported are securely and carefully preserved for posterity, because I think that if they had remained in China, many of these beautiful objects would have been destroyed." He suggested that the Chinese should blame some "foreigners." He claimed that the person who was responsible for the removal of the famous relief panels of the Taizong emperor's chargers was "a foreign dealer."

== Personal life ==
Not long after he opened his Paris gallery, Loo was struck by the beauty of Olga Hortense Libmond (1876–1960), a woman four years his elder who ran a milliner's shop a few doors away. They fell in love, and indeed saw each other constantly until his death in 1957, and she guided his life and career. But since she wanted to maintain her relationships with an older man who had financed her business, she instead offered her 15-year-old daughter, Marie-Rose (1895–1971), to Loo in marriage. Marie-Rose remained married to Loo until his death in 1957. They had four daughters, among them Janine Loo Pierre-Emmanuel, wife of Pierre Emmanuel.

Loo died in Nyon, Switzerland, 15 August 1957. His body was returned to Paris, where it was interred in the burial plot of his wife's family.

== Pagoda Paris ==
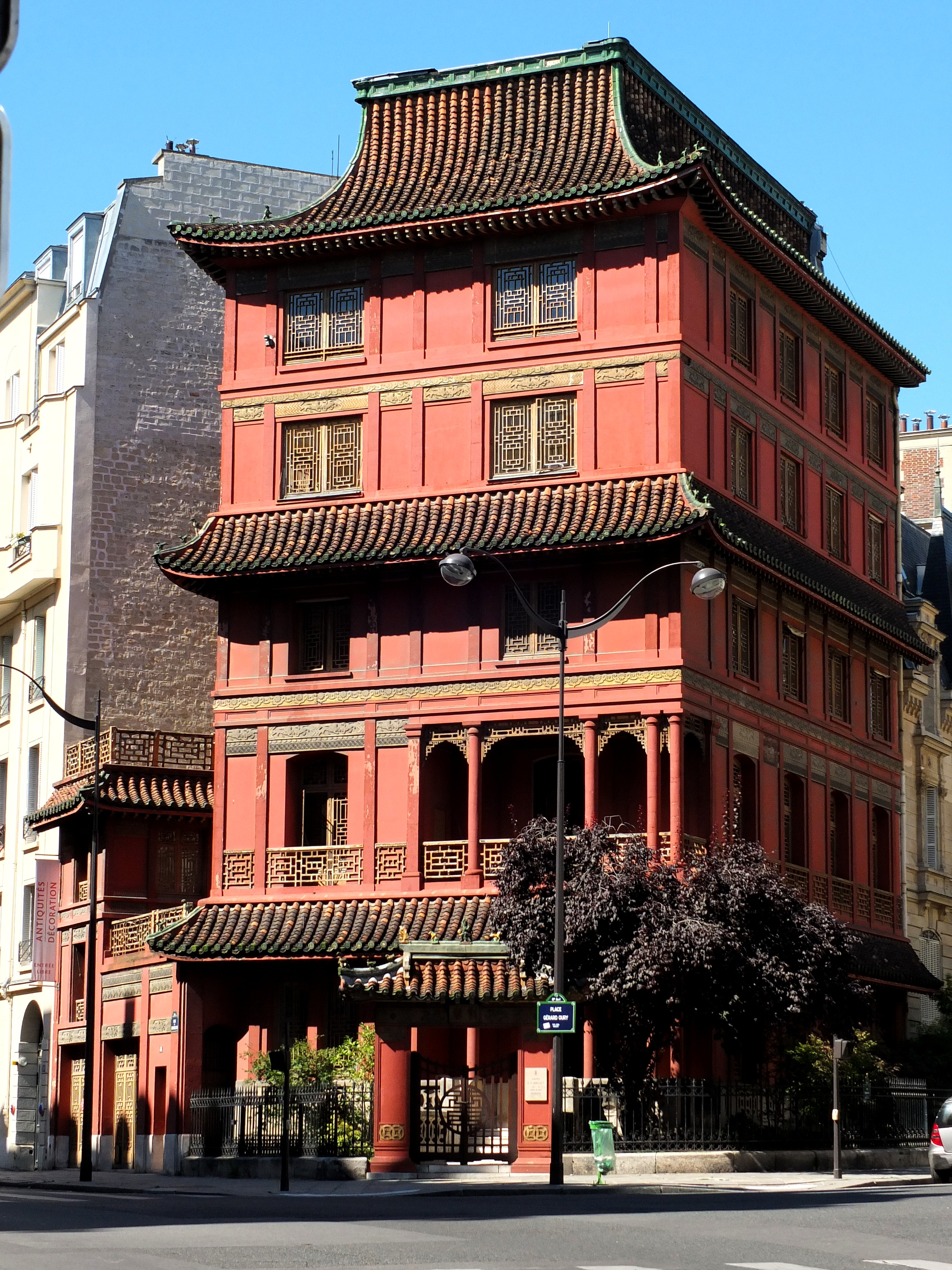
The Pagoda Paris

In 1925, Loo bought and substantially remodeled a townhouse in the 8th Arrondissement, which came to be known as "Pagoda Paris." The building became Loo's gallery and home for decades. The red brick building had jade-green roof tiles and Chinese gargoyles, 16th- and 17th-century lacquered wood paneling, an art deco glass ceiling depicting Chinese characters, an 18th- and 19th-century sculpted wood galleria of Indian origin, and a lacquer and wood elevator. The building fell into disrepair after Loo's death, but was purchased by a private French investor in 2010 and renovated as a venue for art and events.

== Selected publications and catalogs ==
- Loo, C. T. et compagnie Paris American Art Association (1915). Catalogue of Antique Chinese Porcelains Pottery, Carved Jades, Agates and Rugs and Carpets Belonging to Loo & Cie., (Société Chinoise Léyer) ... The Entire Collection to Be Sold at Unrestricted Public Sale at the American Art Galleries ... On [May 5th and 6th, 1915]. New York: American Art Assoc. HathiTrust.
- —— (1917). Some Ancient Chinese Art. Philadelphia: University of Pennsylvania University Museum.
- Pelliot, Paul Loo Ching Tsai C. T. Loo Inc (1925). Jades Archaïques De Chine Appartenant À M. C. T. Loo. Paris: G. van Oest.
- Rostovtzeff, Michael Ivanovitch C. T. Loo and Cie (1927). Inlaid Bronzes of the Han Dynasty in the Collection of C.T. Loo. Paris, Brussels: G. Vanoest.
- —— (1931). Exhibition of Chinese-Indian and Cambodian Art Formed by C.T. Loo. Wildenstein Gallery, New York, 9 to 21st November 1931. Paris: Helio offset des Flandres.
- Salmony, Alfred Hollis Frances Chase Baruch Willy C. T. Loo and Cie (1933). Sino-Siberian Art in the Collection of C.T. Loo. Paris: C.T. Loo.
- —— (1935). An Exhibition of Chinese Bronze, Pottery and Porcelain in Conjunction with Messrs. C.T. Loo of Paris : November 25th — December 14th, 1935 : [Catalogue]. London: John Sparks.
- Kunstzaal van Lier (1938). Sculptures Indiennes De La Collection C.T. Loo À Paris : Exposition. [S.l]: [s.n.]
- Arden, Gallery (1939). 3000 Years of Chinese Jade. New York.
- —— (1940). An Exhibition of Chinese Stone Sculptures. New York City: C.T. Loo & Co.
- Riepe, Marion W. Menzies James M. Plumer James Marshall C. T. Loo (1940). An Exhibition of Ancient Chinese Ritual Bronzes. Detroit, Mich.: Detroit Institute of Art.
- —— (1941). Ancient Chinese Bronzes and Chinese Jewelry; an Exposition of Chinese Craftsmanship in the Field of Metal-Work, Which Is Compared to the Best of Its Kind in the World. Toledo, O.: Toledo Museum of Art.
- —— (1941). Exhibition of Chinese Arts. C.T. Loo & Co. ... New York : Special Sale, November 1, 1941 to April 30, 1942. New York: Printed by the William Bradford Press.
- Pope, John (1942). An Exhibition of the Sculpture of Greater India, a Fully Illustrated Catalogue. New York: C.T. Loo & Co.
- —— (1942). An Index of the History of Chinese Arts: An Aide-Memoire for Beginners. New York: C.T. Loo Co.
- Loo, C.T. (1946). An Exhibition of Figures in Chinese Art, in April of 1946. New York: C.T. Loo & Co.
- Cooper Lindsay Hughes Company (1949). Chinese Frescos of Northern Sung. New York; Paris: C.T. Loo.
- Loo, C.T. (1950). An Exhibition of Chinese Archaic Jades. Arranged for Norton Gallery of Art, West Palm Beach Florida, January 20 to March 1, 1950. New York. hdl:2027/mdp.39015027321242.. HathiTrust.
- --- "Announcement of Liquidation." Art News, May, 1950.
- Sino-Siberian Art : In the Collection of C. T. Loo Sino-Siberian Art : vol.1

== References and further reading ==
- Abe, Stanley (2011), "Rockefeller home decorating and objects from China", in Vimalin Rujivacharakul (ed.), Collecting China: The World, China, and a History of Collecting, Newark: University of Delaware Press, pp. 107–123, ISBN 978-1-61149-006-0
- Beres, Tiffany (2012). "The Pagoda Paris: A Monument to Asian Art in Europe". Asian Art. Archived from the original on 7 October 2013.
- Cohen, Warren I. (1992). East Asian Art and American Culture: A Study in International Relations. New York: Columbia University Press. ISBN 0231076444.
- Lenain, Géraldine (2013). Monsieur Loo, Le Roman D'un Marchand D'art Asiatique (PDF) (in French). Editions Philippe Picquier. ISBN 978-2809734591. Archived from the original (PDF) on 14 July 2014.
- Heydt, E. von der (1957). "Cheng-Tsai Loo". Artibus Asiae. 20 (2–3): 186.
- Pilling, David (25 April 2014). "CT Loo: Champion of Chinese Art... Or Villain?". FT Magazine.
- Rujivacharakul, Vimalin (2011). Collecting China: The World, China, and a History of Collecting. Newark: University of Delaware Press. ISBN 9781611490060.
- Wang, Yiyou (2007). The Loouvre from China a Critical Study of C.T. Loo and the Framing of Chinese Art in the United States, 1915–1950 (Thesis). Doctoral Dissertation, Department of History, Ohio University.
- Wang, Daisy Y. "C. T. Loo and the Chinese Art Collection at the Freer, 1915–1951." Arts of Asia, 40.5 (2011): 104–16.
- --, "Papa's Pagoda in Paris: The Gift of the C. T. Loo Family Photographs to the Freer and Sackler Galleries". Orientations 44.2 (2013): 135–44.
