= Puning Temple =

Puning Temple (simplified Chinese: 普宁寺; traditional Chinese: 普寧寺; pinyin: Pǔníng Sì; lit. 'Temple of Universal Peace'), may refer to:

- Puning Temple (Hebei), in Chengde, Hebei, China.
- Puning Temple (Jiangxi), in Yushan County, Jiangxi, China.
