= Six Steeds of Zhao Mausoleum =

Funerary art at the Xi'an Beilin Museum in China

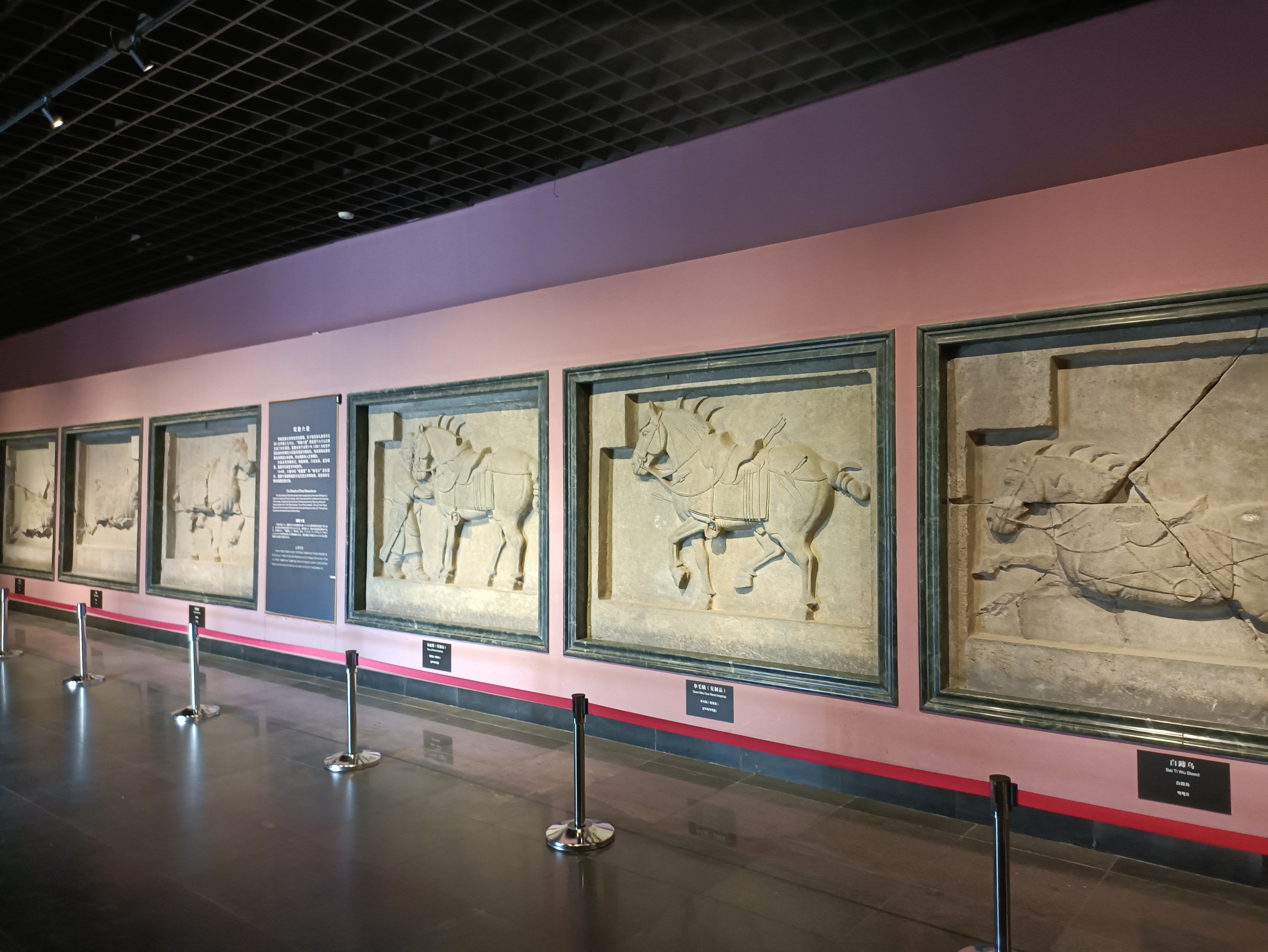
The Six Steeds of Zhao Mausoleum at the Xi'an Beilin Museum

The Six Steeds of Zhao Mausoleum (simplified Chinese: 昭陵六骏; traditional Chinese: 昭陵六駿; pinyin: Zhāolíng Liùjùn) are six Chinese stone reliefs of horses. Dated to the Tang dynasty (618–907), each of the reliefs measure to be 1.7 by 2.0 metres (5.6 ft × 6.6 ft). They were located in the Zhao mausoleum, the mausoleum of Emperor Taizong of Tang (r. 626–649), in Shaanxi, China.

By tradition the reliefs were designed by the court painter, and administrator for public works, Yan Liben, and the relief is so flat and linear that it seems likely they were carved after drawings or paintings. Yan Liben is documented as producing other works for the tomb, a portrait series that is now lost, and perhaps designed the whole structure.

The steeds were six precious war horses of Taizong, which he rode during the early campaigns to reunify China under the Tang, and all bear names which are not Chinese but rather transliterations of Turkic or Central Asian terms, indicative of the horses' probable origin as gifts or tributes from the Tujue to the Tang forces. They are:

- Quanmaogua (拳毛騧), Taizong's steed during the campaign against Liu Heita.
- Shifachi (什伐赤), ridden during the Battle of Hulao against Dou Jiande. Its name derives from the Turkic term Shad.
- Baitiwu (白蹄乌), ridden during the campaign against Xue Rengao.
- Telebiao (特勒骠), ridden during the campaign against Song Jingang. Its name is originally Teqin (特勤), derived from the Turkic term Tegin.
- Qingzhui (青骓), ridden during the campaign against Dou Jiande.
- Saluzi (飒露紫), ridden during the campaign against Wang Shichong. Its name derives from the Turkic Isbara, itself a derivation from the Sanskrit Isvara, meaning prince.

The sculptures are regarded as ancient Chinese art treasures. Two (Quanmaogua and Saluzi) were sold by C.T. Loo in 1914 and are exhibited at the Penn Museum at University of Pennsylvania, USA. The remaining four are exhibited in the Stele Forest museum of Xi'an.

== Gallery ==
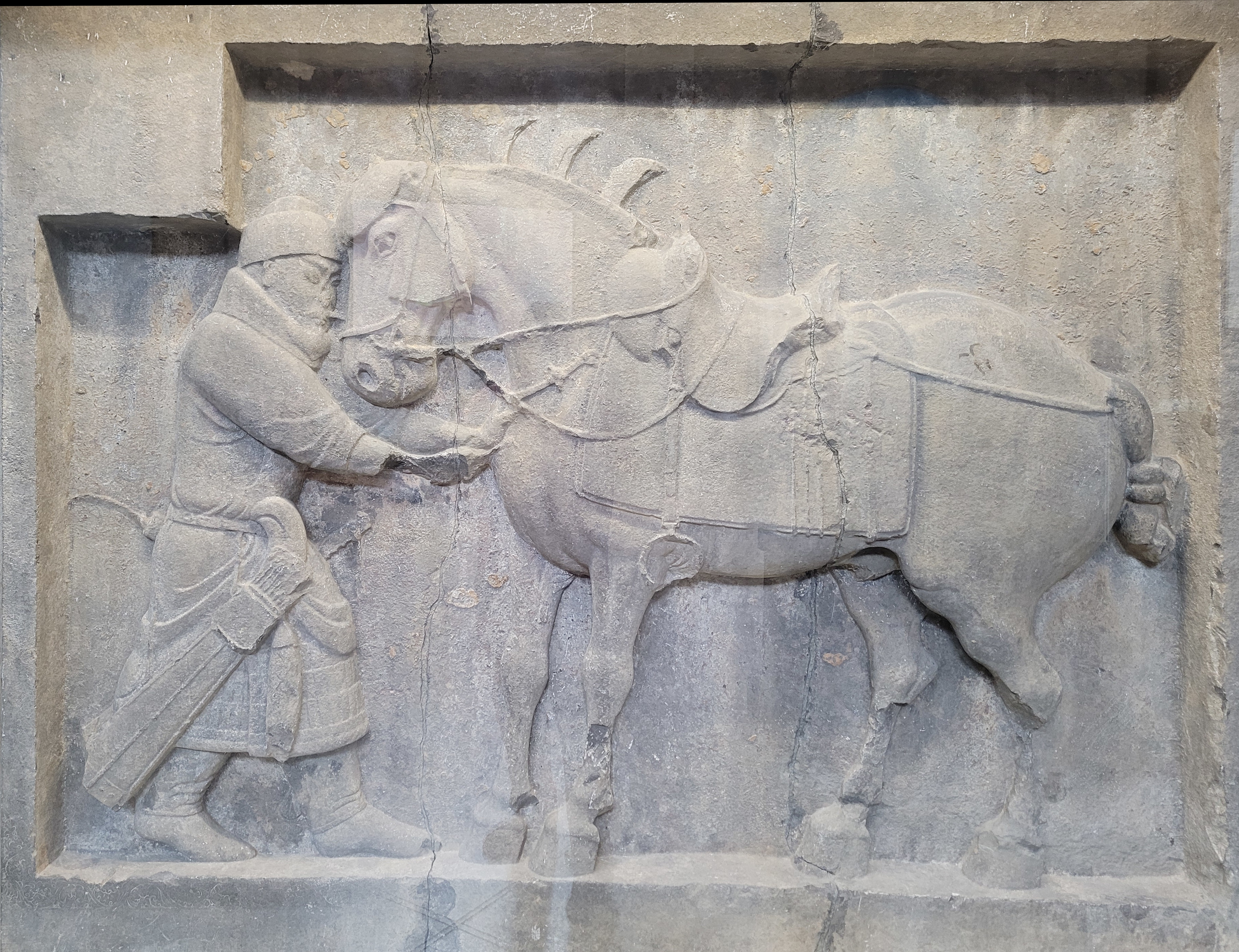
One of the reliefs, very likely after a drawing by Yan Liben, at the Penn Museum. Here a general removes an arrow from the horse Saluzi

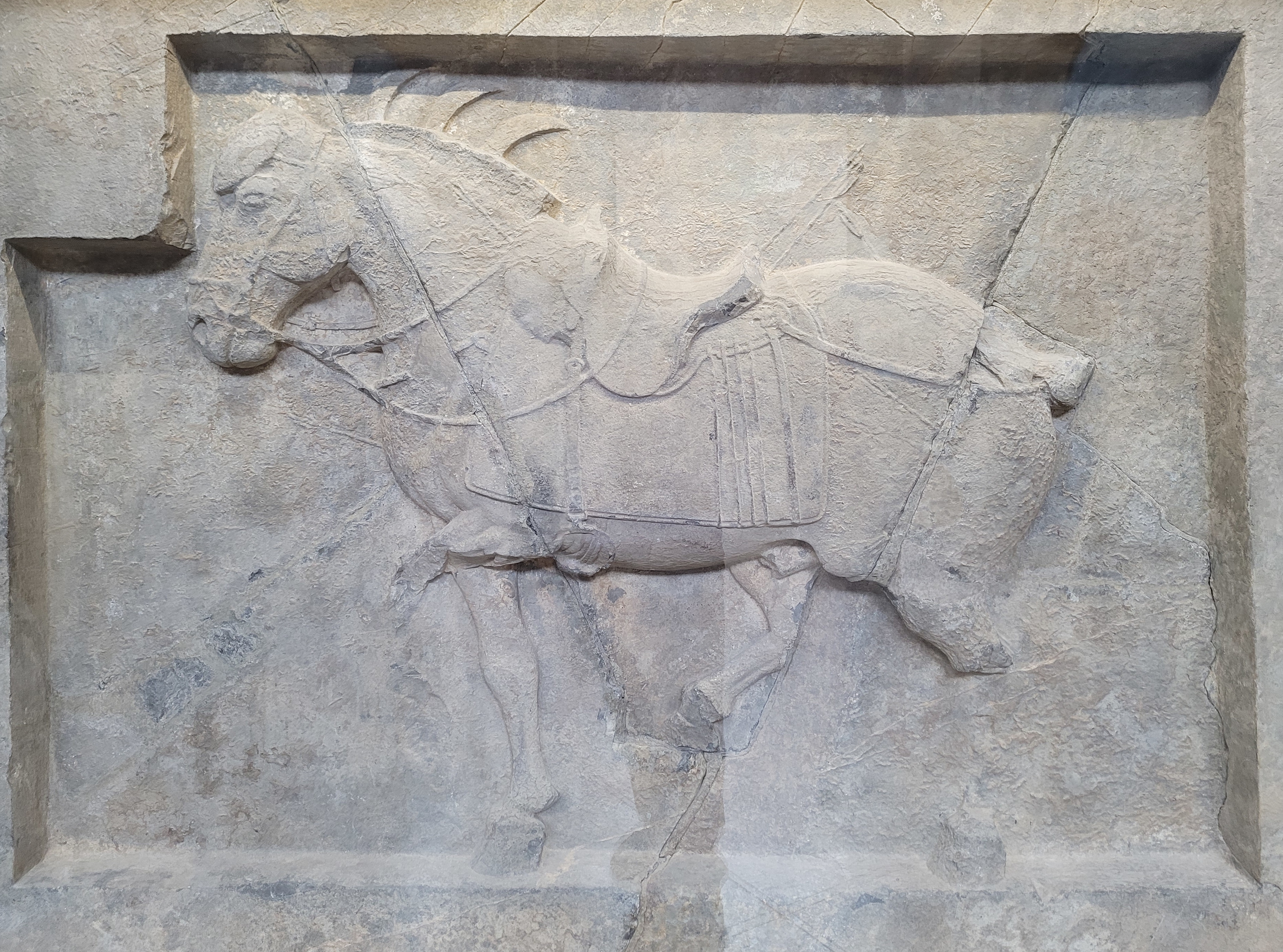
Limestone relief of Quanmaogua ("Curly"). Nine arrows penetrate Quanmaogua, six in front and three in back. On display at the Penn Museum in Philadelphia.

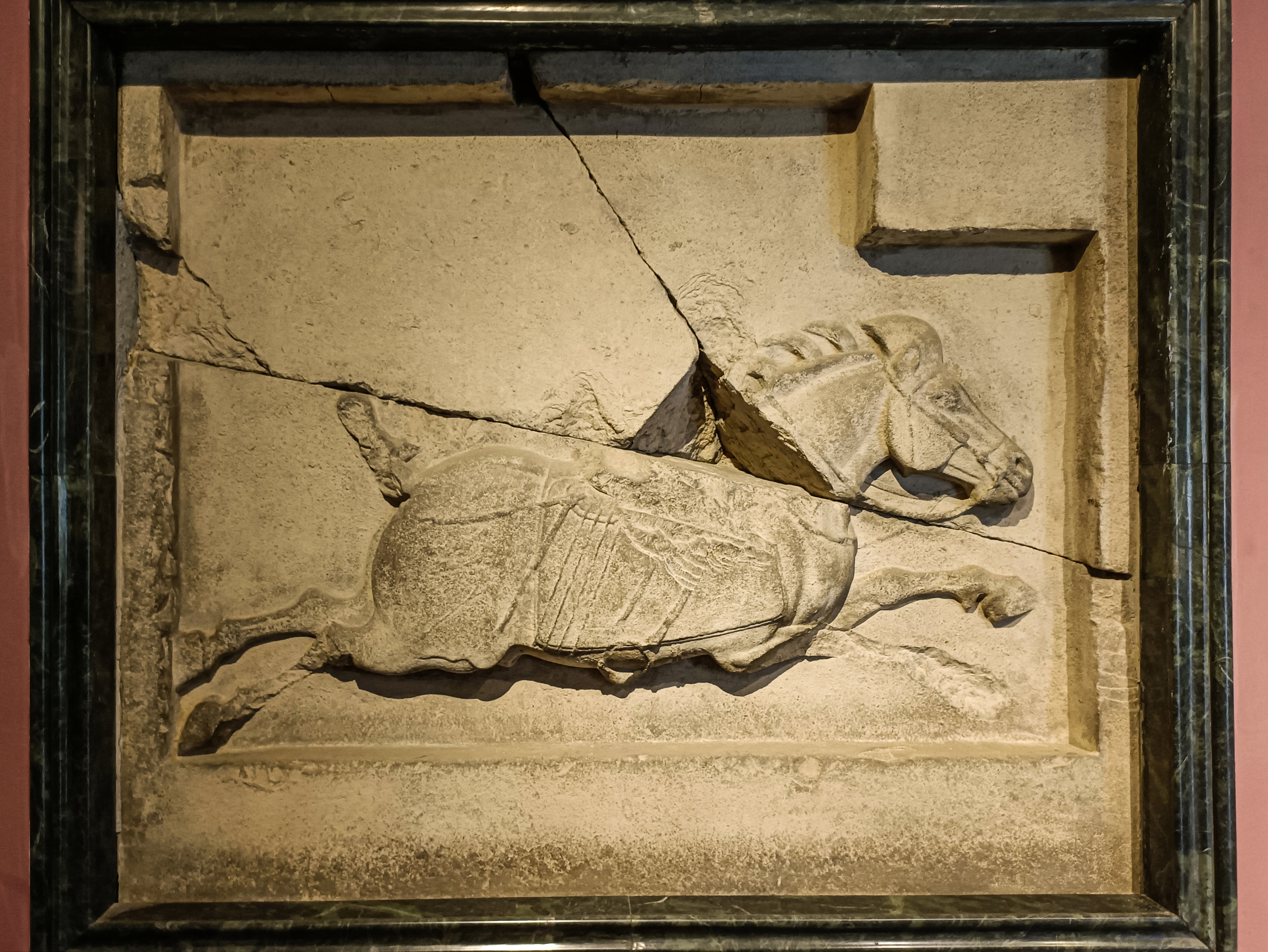
Shifachi Steed at Beilin Museum

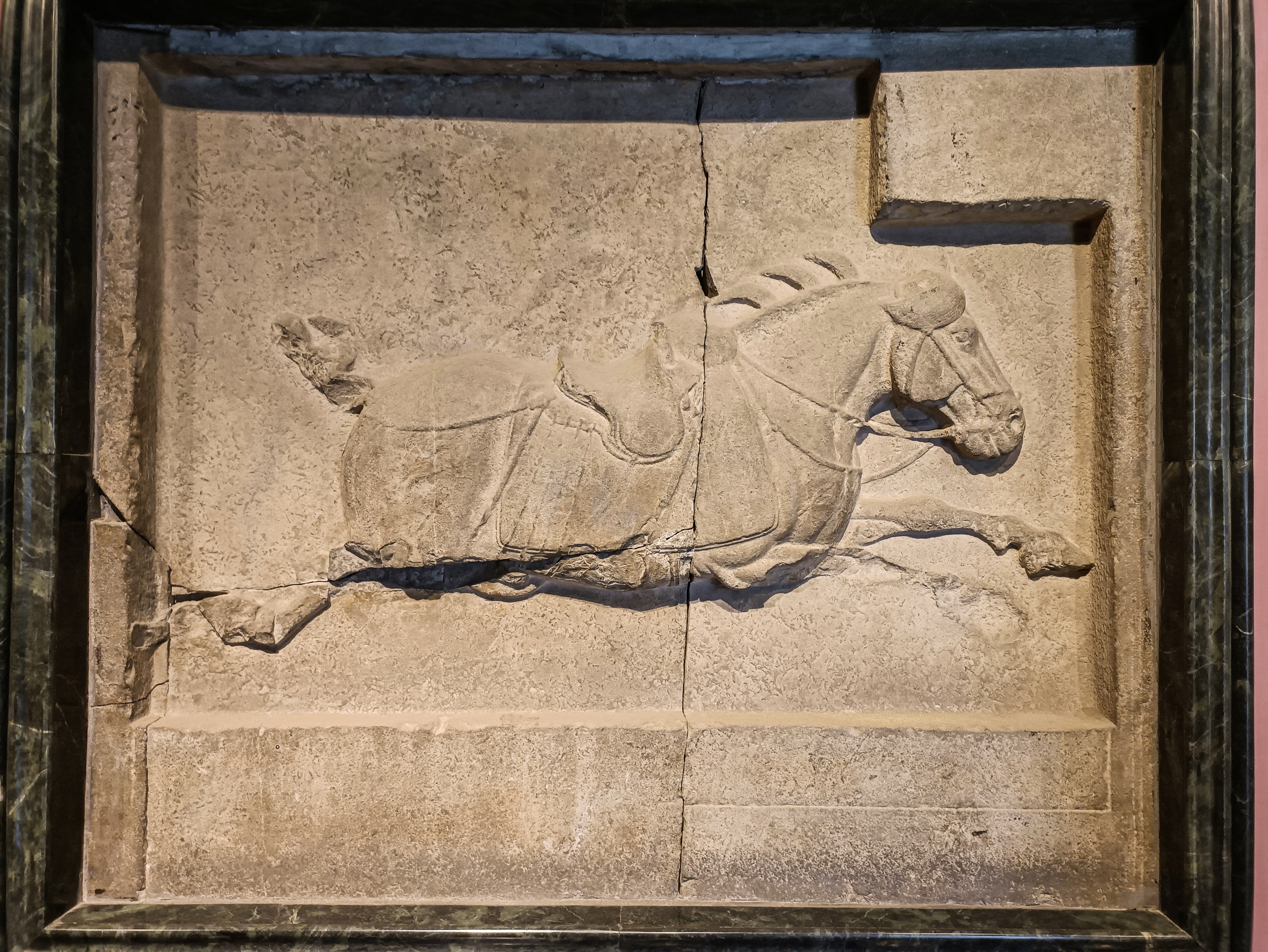
Qingzhui Steed at Beilin Museum

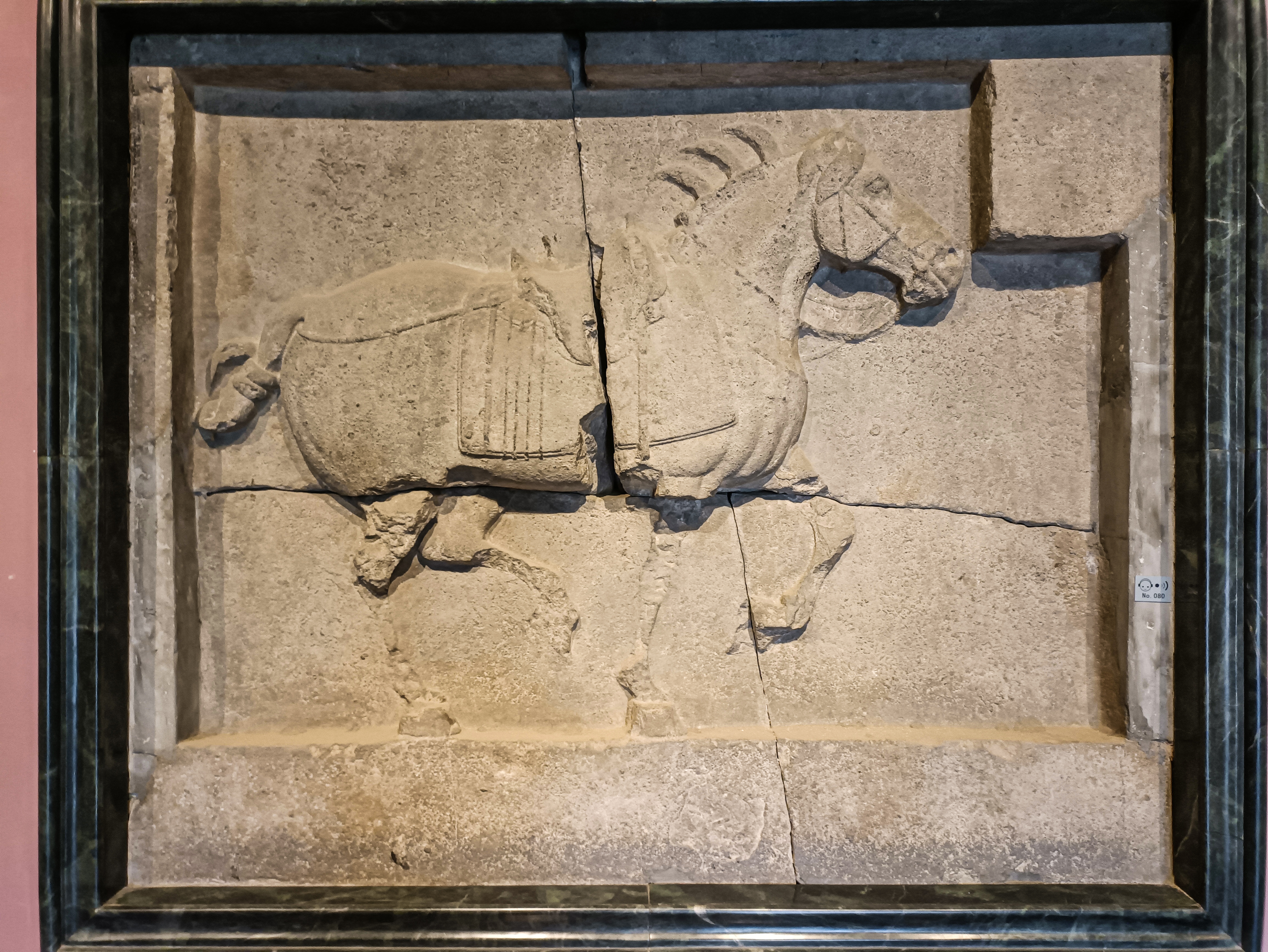
Telebiao Steed at Beilin Museum

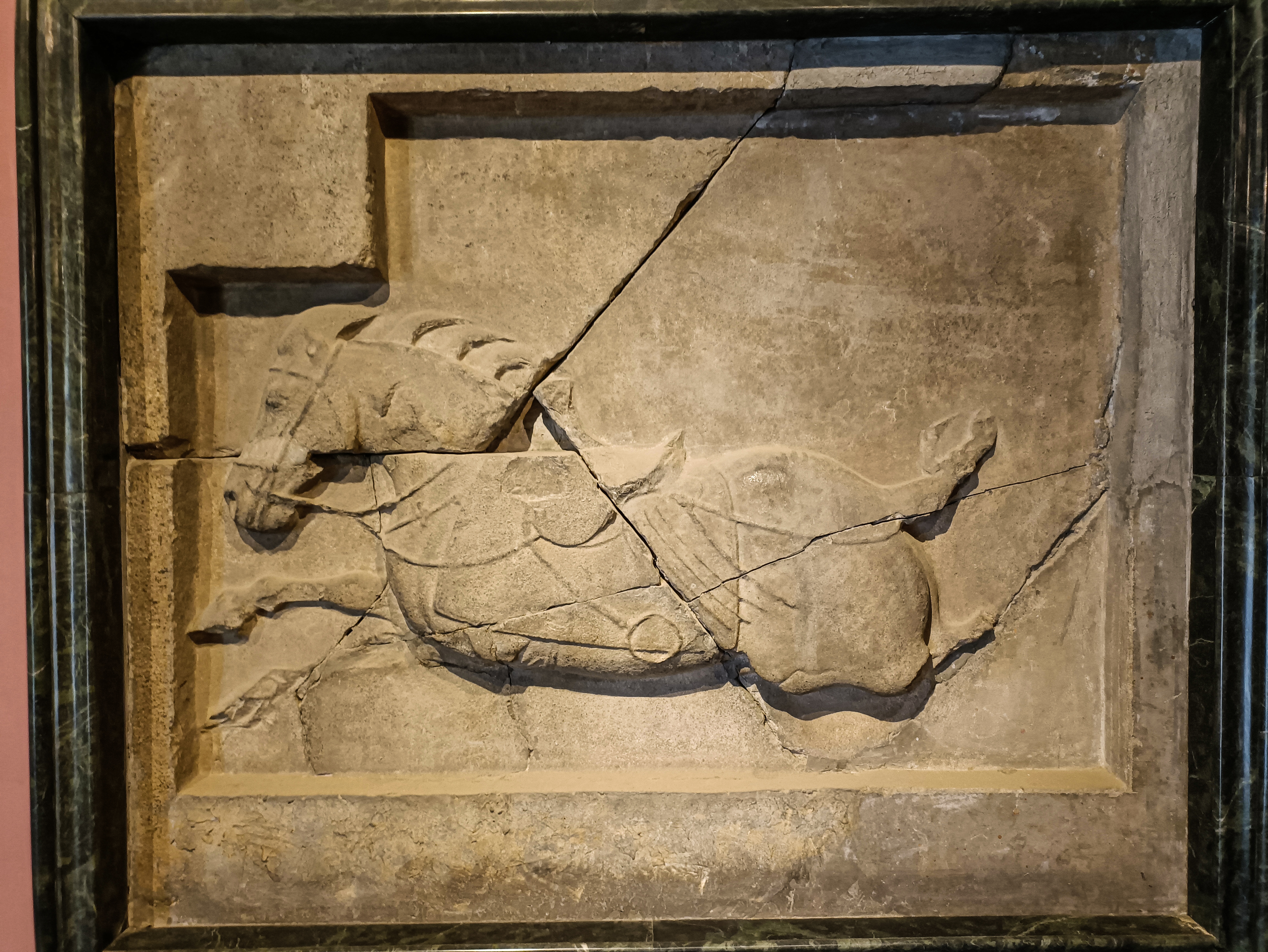
Baitiwu Steed at Beilin Museum
