= Puning Temple (Jiangxi) =

Buddhist temple in Jiangxi, China

- 普宁寺
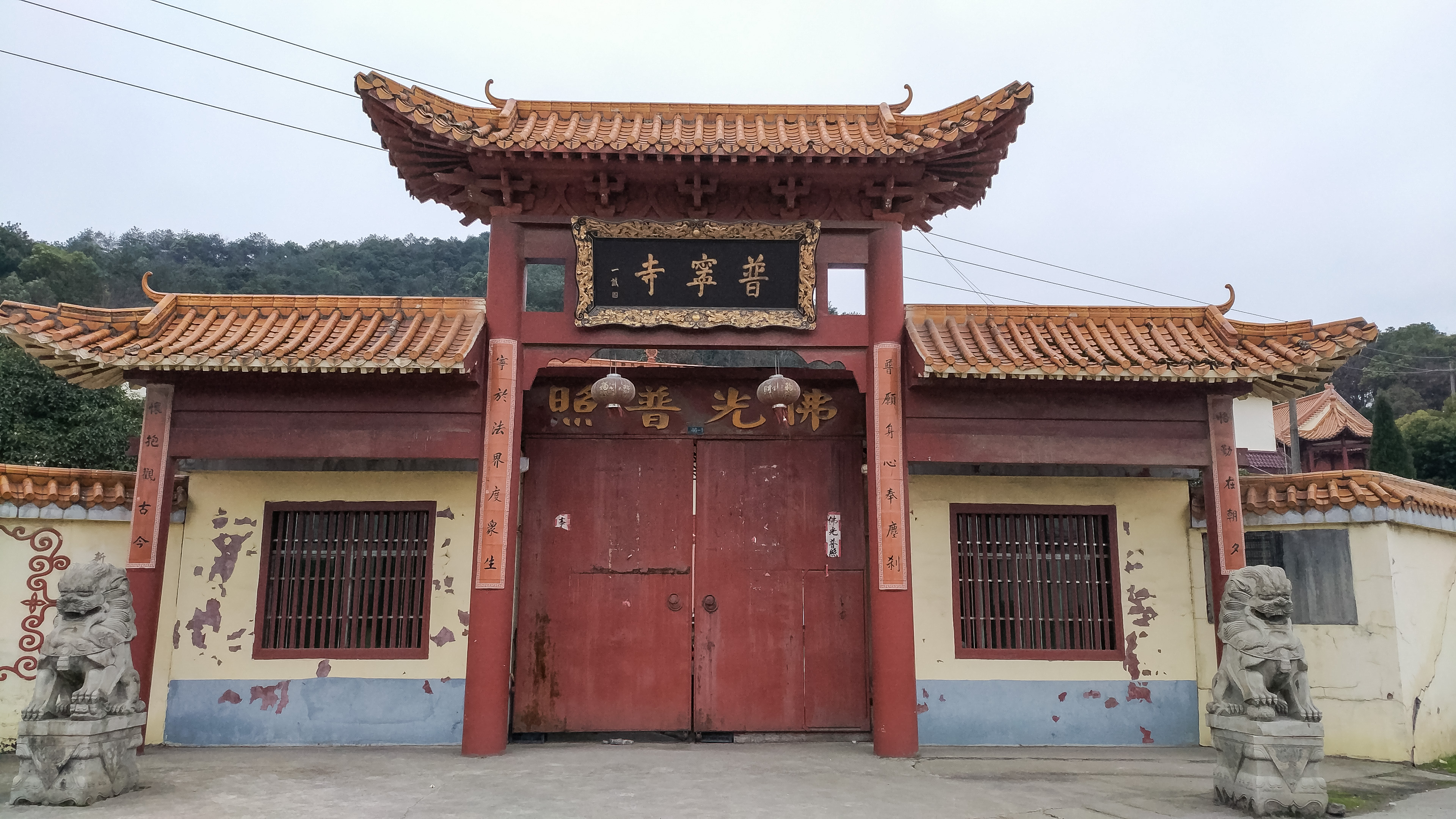
- The Shanmen at Puning Temple.

Religion
- Affiliation: Buddhism
- Deity: Chan Buddhism–Caodong school
- Leadership: Shi Zhaorong (释照荣)

Location
- Location: Mount Wu'an, Yushan County, Jiangxi
- Country: China
- Interactive map of Puning Temple
- Coordinates: 28°40′10.9″N 118°15′08.02″E

Architecture
- Style: Chinese architecture
- Founder: Shi Dading (释达定)
- Creator: Yan Liben
- Established: 668–670
- Completed: 1994 (reconstruction)

Puning Temple (simplified Chinese: 普宁寺; traditional Chinese: 普寧寺; pinyin: Pǔníng Sì; lit. 'Temple of Universal Peace') is a Buddhist temple located on Mount Wu'an in Yushan County, Jiangxi, China.

== History ==
The temple was first established between 668 and 670, under the Tang dynasty (618–907). It was converted from the private residence donated by painter and official Yan Liben.

The temple had reached an unprecedented heyday in the Song dynasty (960–1279), during that time, it was about 30 mu in size with over 100 rooms and halls, and included 160 monks.

After Song dynasty, the temple declined and mostly disappeared during the late Yuan dynasty (1271–1368).

Puning Temple was restored in 1822, in the reign of Daoguang Emperor in the Qing dynasty (1644–1911).

In 1924, Puning Temple collapsed due to neglect. Then Abbot Fasen (法森) rebuilt it.

In 1933, in order to build the Zhejiang–Jiangxi railway, the government demolished the Middle Hall.

In 1942, Puning Temple turned to ashes by a devastating fire during the Japanese invasion of the Second Sino-Japanese War.

== Architecture ==
Now the existing main buildings include Shanmen, Heavenly Kings Hall, Mahavira Hall, Buddhist Texts Library and the Tomb of Yan Liben.

== Gallery ==
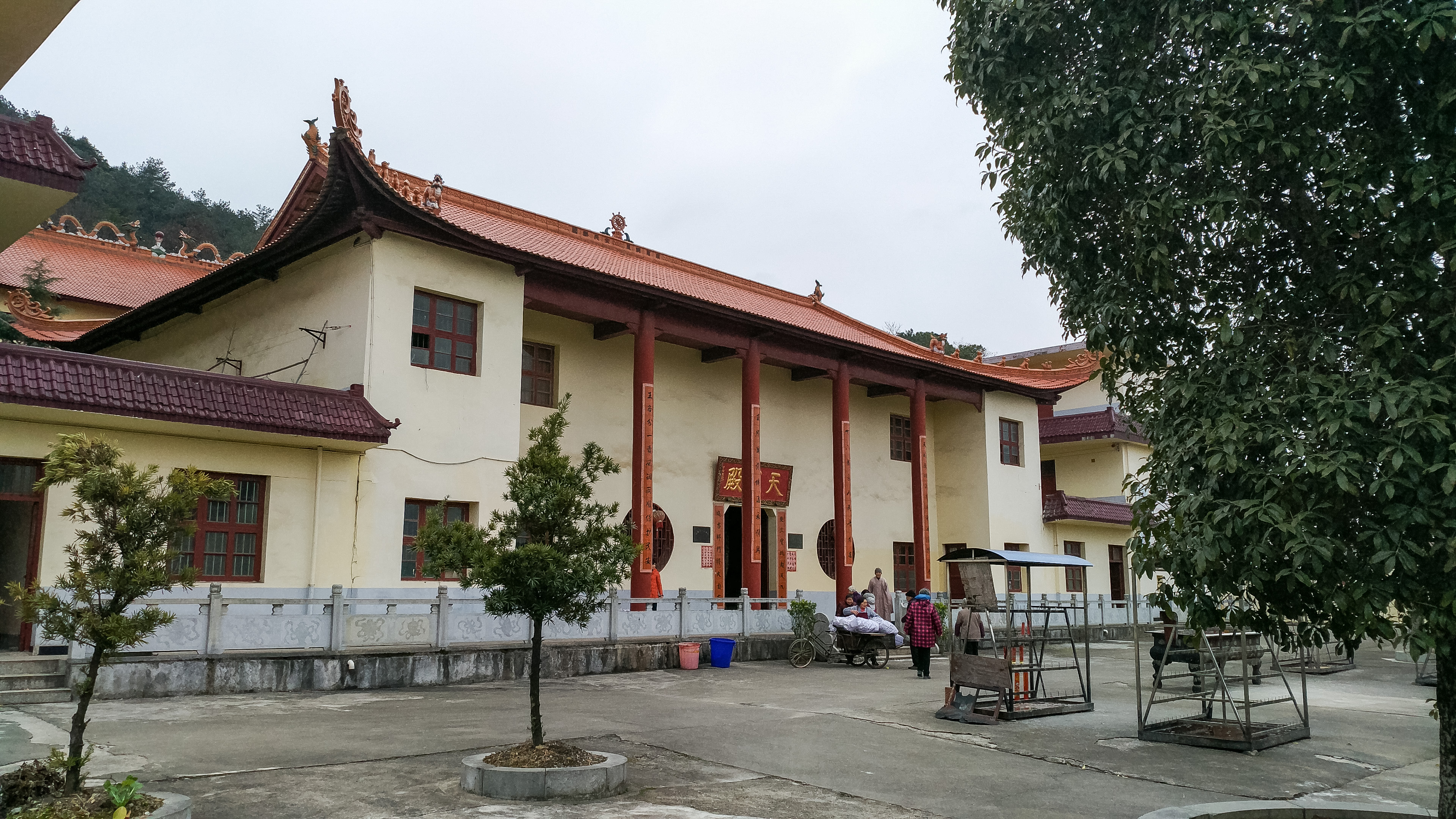
Heavenly Kings Hall.

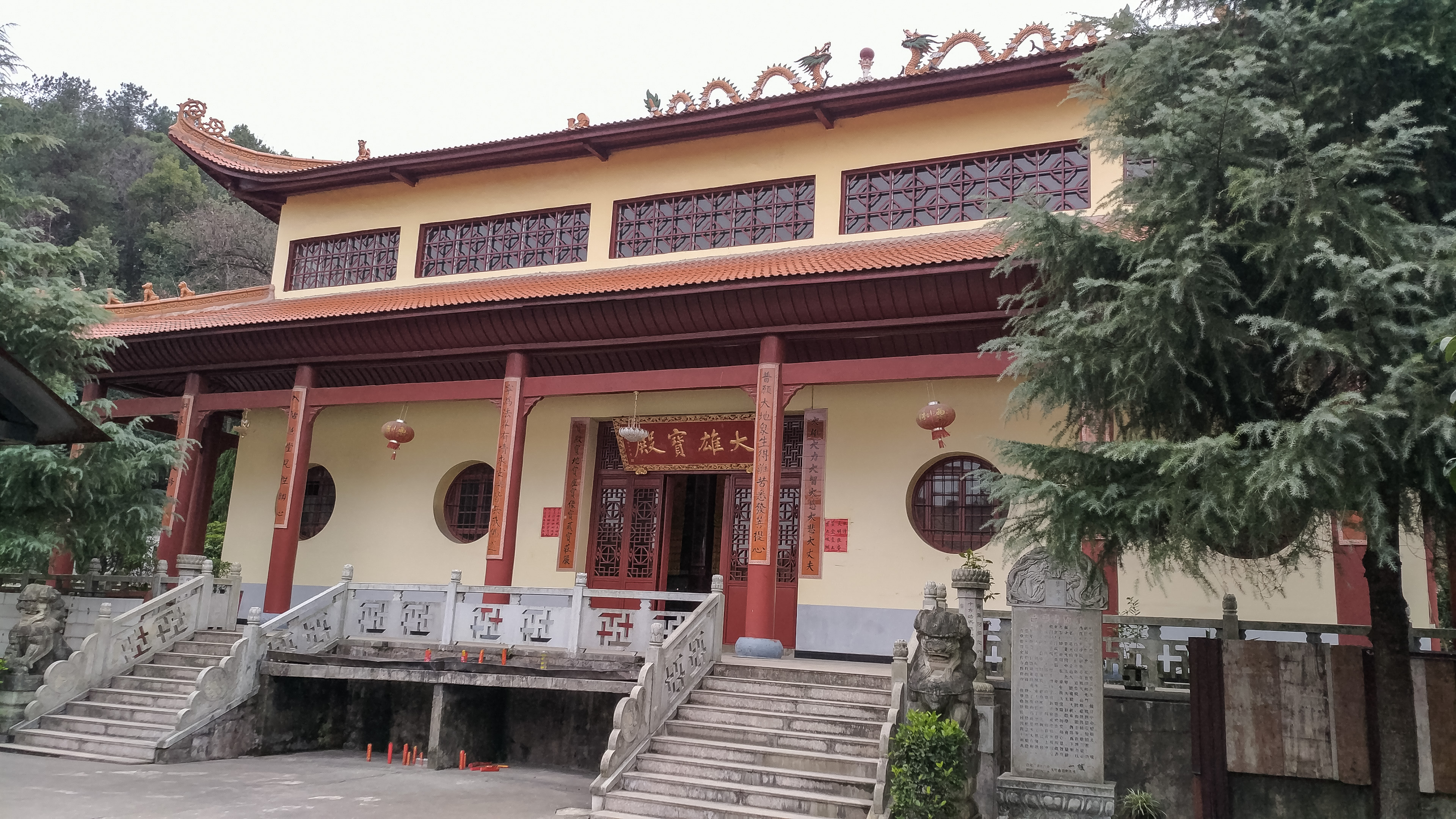
Mahavira Hall.

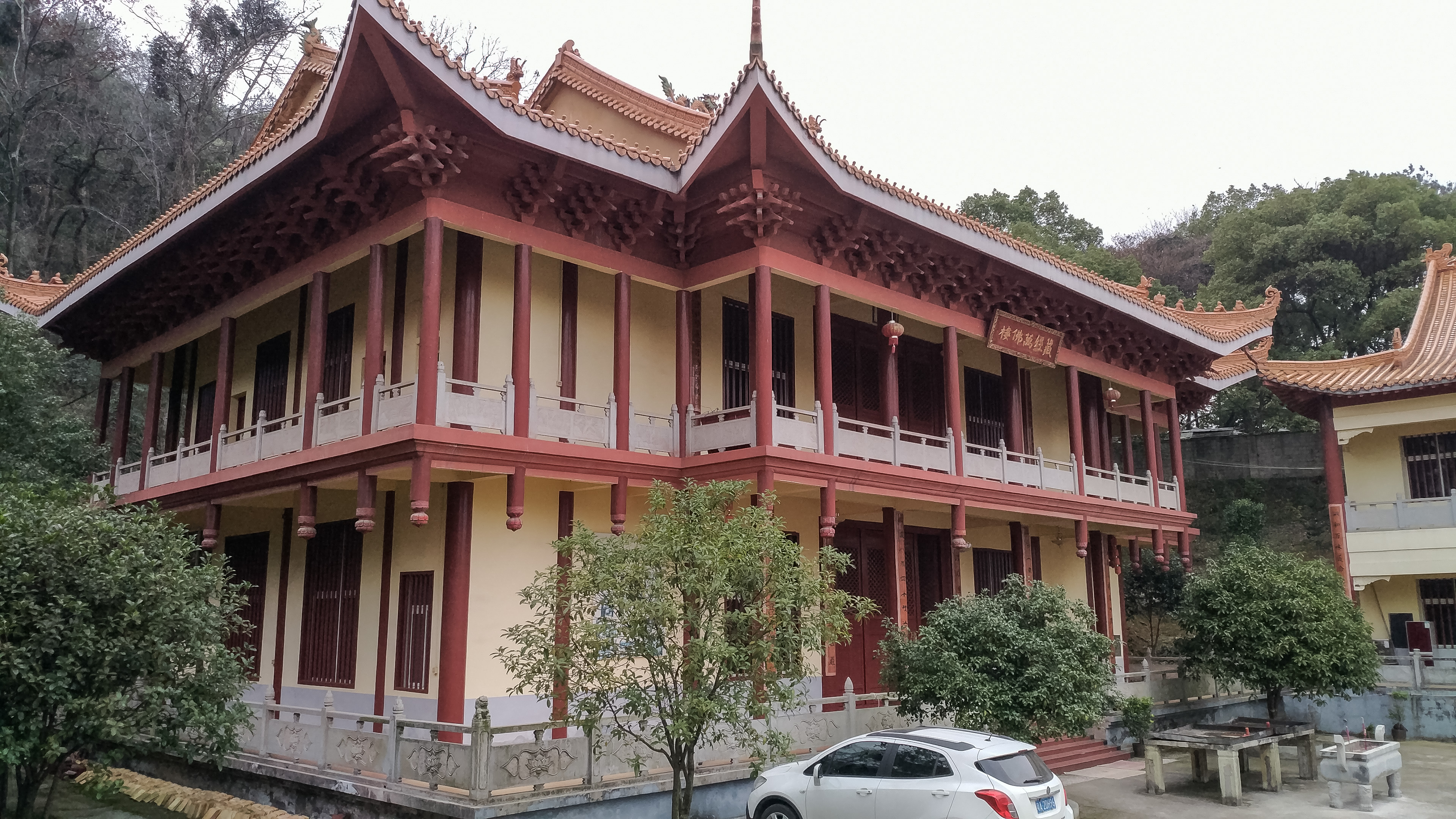
Buddhist Texts Library.

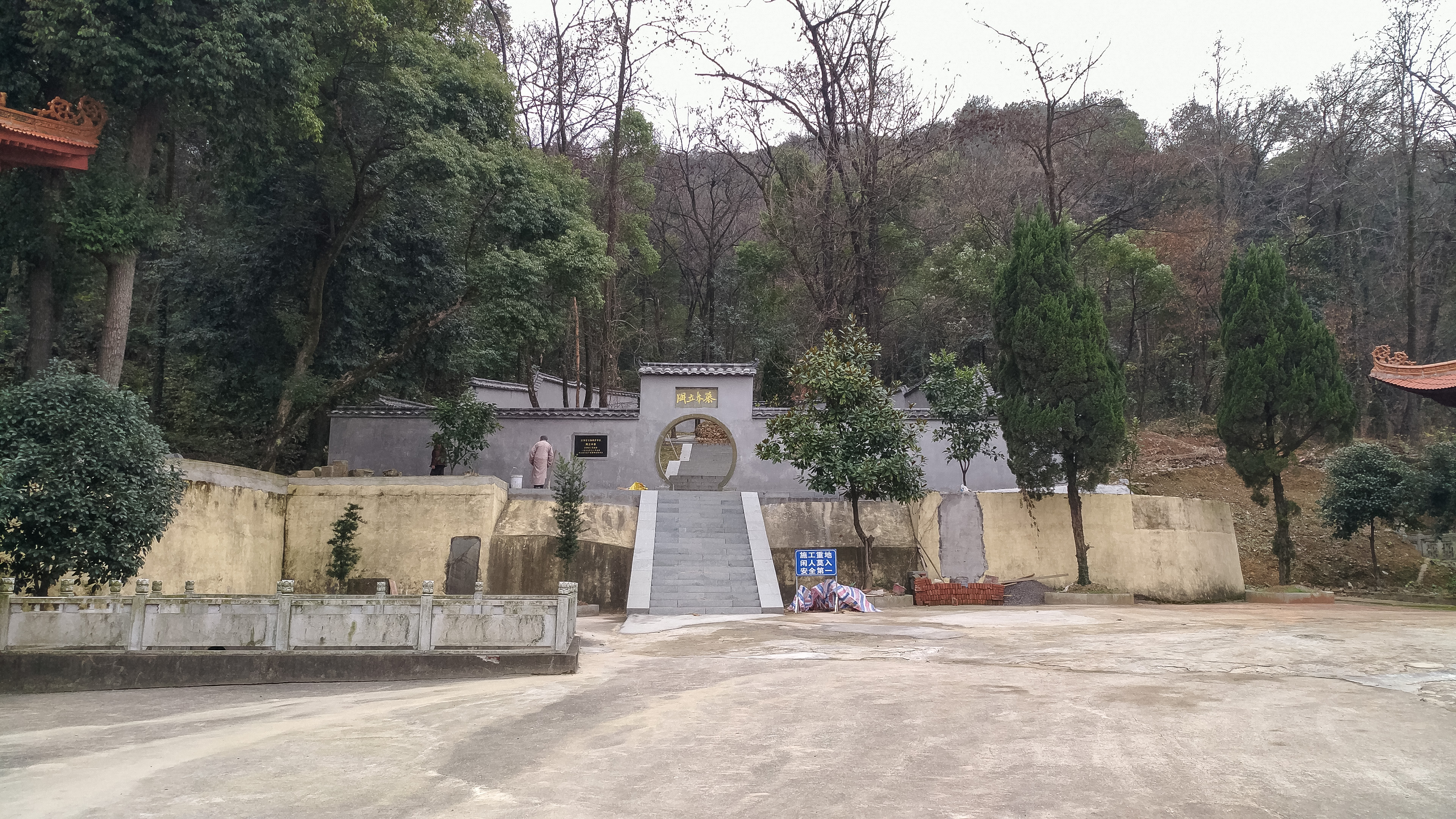
Tomb of Yan Liben.
