= Emperor Taizong Receiving the Tibetan Envoy =

Painting by Yan Liben

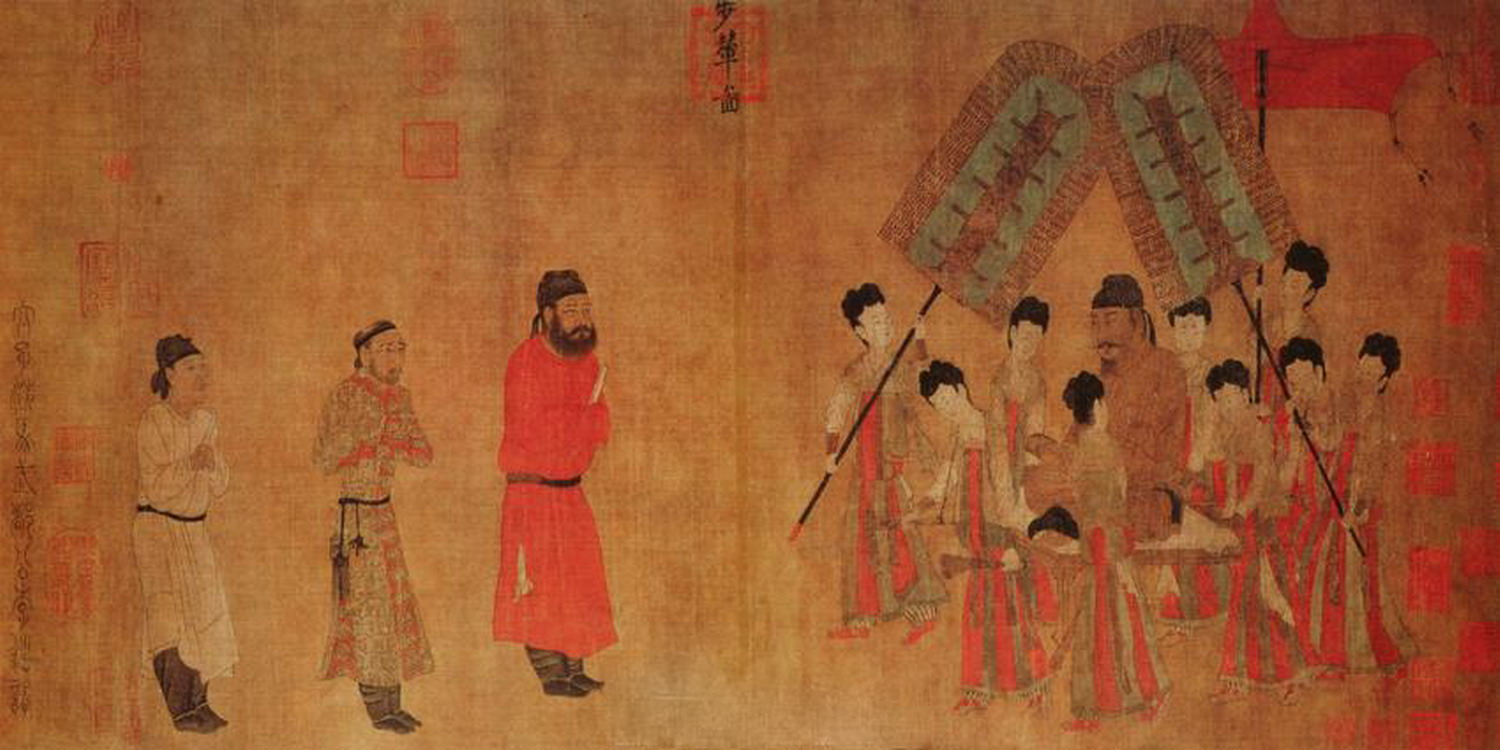
Bunian Tu

Emperor Taizong Receiving the Tibetan Envoy (Chinese: 步輦圖; pinyin: Bùniǎn Tú), also referred to as Bunian Tu, is a painting on silk by Yan Liben of the Tang dynasty. It depicts a scene in 640 when the Tibetan Empire envoy Gar Tongtsen Yulsung led an embassy to the court of the Emperor Taizong of Tang in Chang'an. The painting measures 129 centimetres (51 in) long by 38.5 centimetres (15.2 in) wide. It is housed in the Palace Museum in Beijing.

As with other early Chinese paintings, the scroll in Beijing is probably a faithful later copy of Yan Liben's original, perhaps from the Song dynasty, but the imperial collectors' seals and added comments show that it was very highly valued from at least the start of the 14th century.

== Background ==
In the seventh century, Tibet grew stronger and stronger. In 634, Songtsen Gampo sent an envoy to Chang'an, the capital of the Tang dynasty, to propose a marriage. Emperor Taizong of Tang accepted the proposal and decided to give him his daughter Princess Wencheng in marriage. In 641, Gar Tongtsen Yülsung (祿東贊), the prime minister of Songtsen Gampo, came to Chang'an to accompany the princess back to Tibet. She brought with her many vegetable seeds, tea, books, and craftsmen which played a very important role in the Tibetan cultural and economical development.

== Characters in the painting ==
The emperor sits on the sedan surrounded by maids holding fans and canopy. He looks composed and peaceful. On the left, one person in red is the official in the royal court. The envoy stands aside seriously and holds the emperor in awe. The last person is an interpreter.

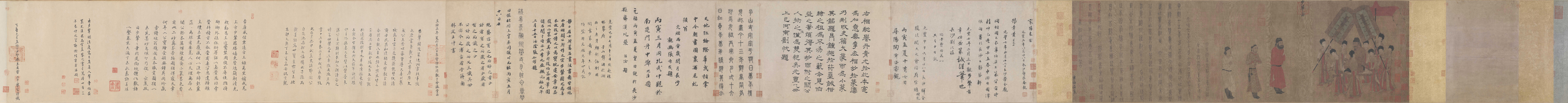
Full scroll of the Emperor Taizong Receiving the Tibetan Envoy. Song dynasty copy
