= Yan Liben =

Chinese painter (c. 600-673)

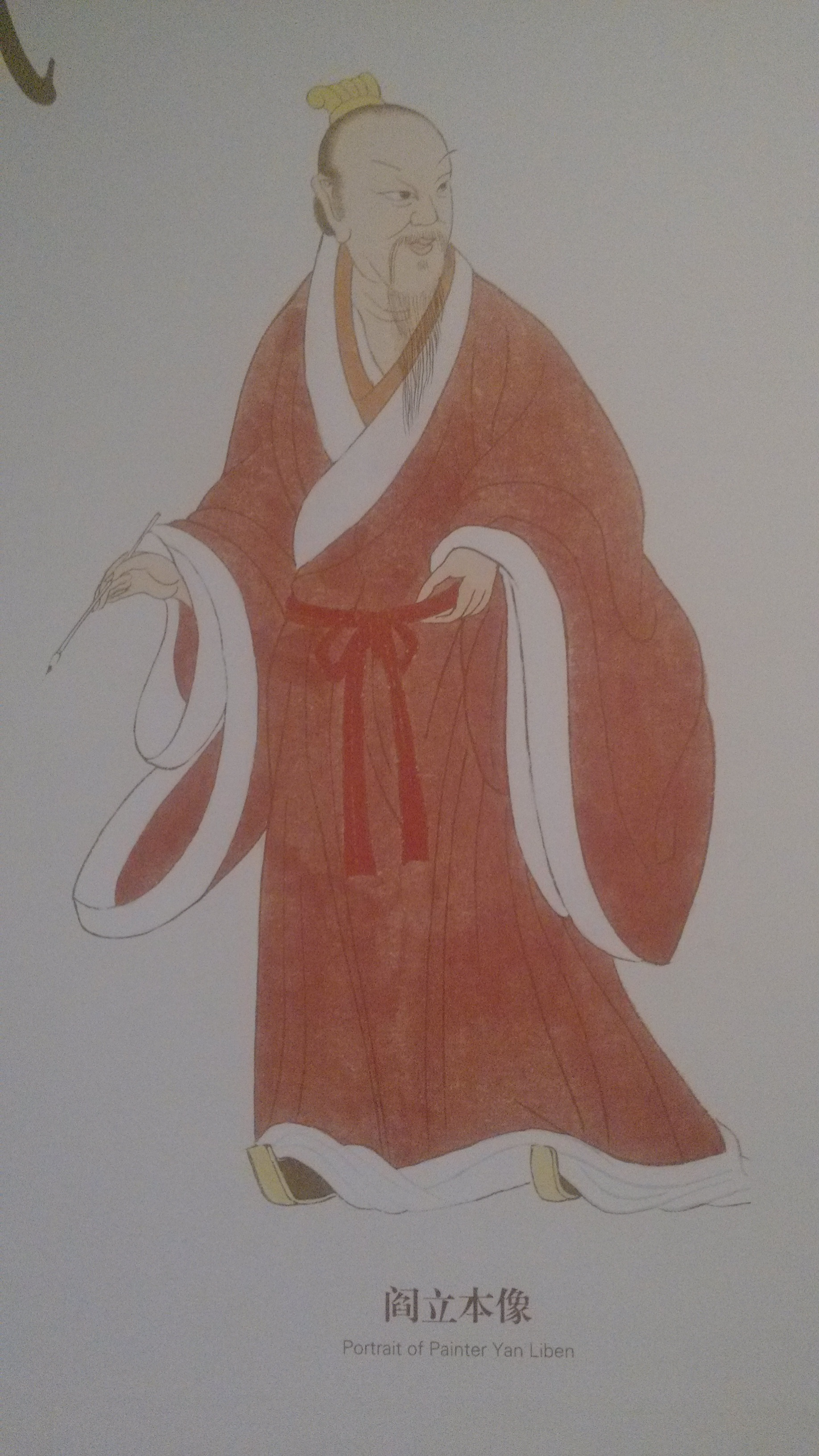
Portrait of Yan Liben

Yan Liben (Chinese: 閻立本; pinyin: Yán Lìběn; Wade–Giles: Yen Li-pen; c. 600 – 14 November 673), posthumous name Baron Wenzhen of Boling (博陵文貞男), was a Chinese architect, painter, and politician during the early Tang dynasty. His most famous work, possibly the only genuine survival, is the Thirteen Emperors Scroll. He also painted the Portraits at Lingyan Pavilion, under Emperor Taizong of Tang, commissioned in 643 to commemorate 24 of the greatest contributors to Emperor Taizong's reign, as well as 18 portraits commemorating the 18 great scholars who served Emperor Taizong when he was the Prince of Qin. Yan's paintings included painted portraits of various Chinese emperors from the Han dynasty (202 BC–220 AD) up until the Sui dynasty (581–618) period. His works were highly regarded by the Tang writers Zhu Jingxuan and Zhang Yanyuan, who noted his paintings were "works among the glories of all times".

From the years 669 to 673, Yan Liben also served as a chancellor under Emperor Taizong's son Emperor Gaozong (r. 649–683).

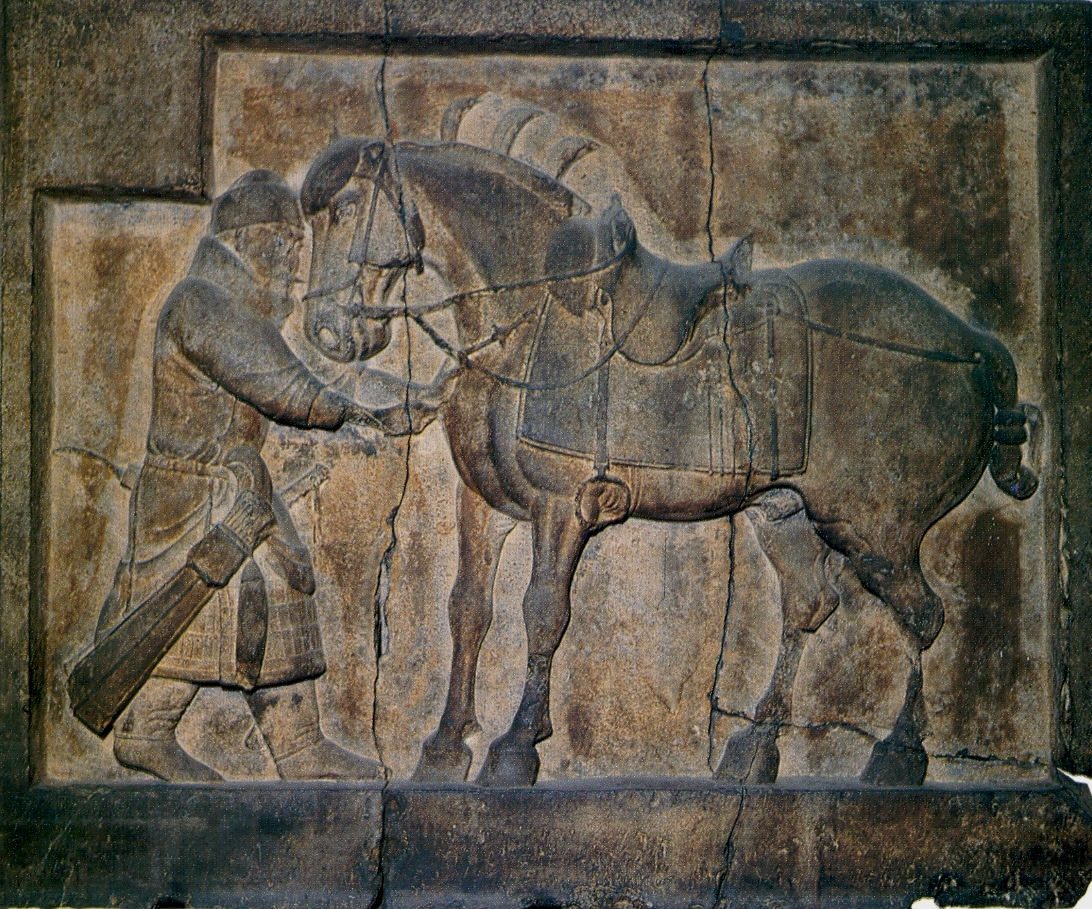
One of the reliefs of the six favourite horses at the mausoleum of Emperor Taizong (d. 649), possibly after a drawing by Yan Liben

A record of 1120 gives 42 titles of Yan's paintings, though the Thirteen Emperors Scroll is not among them. Only four Buddhist subjects are listed, against 12 Daoist. The remainder are portraits, "gods of the planets and constellations" or records of events at court. Of the surviving works attributed to him, the Thirteen Emperors Scroll is "the first that is generally accepted as being partly original", though much of it seems later. A similar figure of an emperor in fresco in the Mogao Caves (Cave 200), might be by the same hand, and carries the appropriate date of 642.

By tradition the reliefs of the six favourite horses at the mausoleum of Emperor Taizong (d. 649) were designed by Yan Liben, and the relief is so flat and linear that it seems likely they were carved after drawings or paintings. Yan Liben is documented as producing other works for the tomb, a portrait series that is now lost, and perhaps designed the whole structure.

== Background ==
It is not known when Yan Liben was born. His ancestors were originally from Mayi (馬邑, in modern Shuozhou, Shanxi), but had relocated to the Guanzhong region (i.e., the region around Chang'an) several generations prior to Yan Liben. Yan Liben's father Yan Pi (閻毘) was the deputy director of palace affairs during Sui dynasty, and both Yan Liben and his older brother Yan Lide (閻立德) were known for their abilities in architectural matters and service to the imperial government in that area.

Both were also painters and successful administrators at court, and trained Yan Liben in succession; his father died suddenly at 49. He grew up in Chang'an, and initially collaborated with his elder brother on two works whose titles are recorded.

== During Emperor Taizong's reign ==
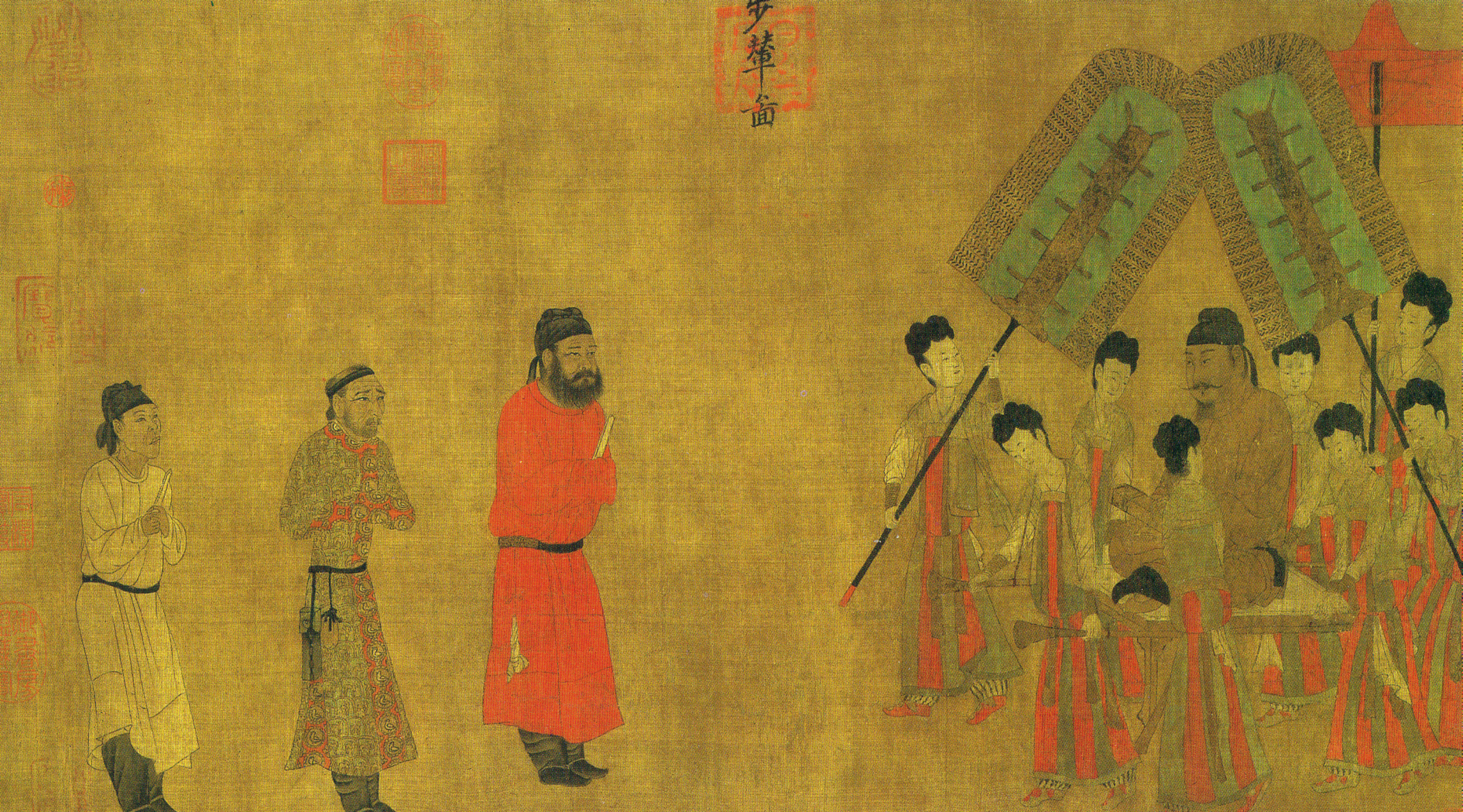
Emperor Taizong Receiving the Tibetan Envoy, probably a later copy

Yan Liben was skilled in public work projects, but became particularly known for his artistic skills. It was for this reason that Emperor Taizong, the second emperor of the Tang dynasty, commissioned Yan to paint portraits to commemorate the 24 great contributors to his reign at Lingyan Pavilion and the 18 great scholars who served under him when he was the Prince of Qin. His Emperor Taizong Receiving the Tibetan Envoy probably dates to this period.

Although the Chinese aristocracy counted painting as one of their accepted pastimes, the profession of the painter was not a highly venerated vocation. On one occasion, when Emperor Taizong was rowing a boat with his attendant scholars at the imperial pond, there were birds flying by. Emperor Taizong had the scholars write poems to praise the scene and then summoned Yan to paint a portrait of the scene. Yan was at the time already a mid-level official in the administration, but when he summoned Yan, the imperial attendants called out, "Summon the imperial painter, Yan Liben!" When Yan heard the order, he became ashamed for being known only as the painter, and he commented to his son, "I had studied well when I was young, and it was fortunate of me to have avoided being turned away from official service and to be known for my abilities. However, now I am only known for my painting skills, and I end up serving like a servant. This is shameful. Do not learn this skill." However, as he still favored painting, he continued to do so even after this incident.

== During Emperor Gaozong's reign ==
During the Xianqing era (656–661) of the reign of Emperor Taizong's son Emperor Gaozong, Yan Liben served as the imperial architect. He later succeeded his brother Yan Lide as the minister of public works (工部尚書, Gongbu Shangshu). Around the new year 669, he became acting You Xiang (右相): the head of the examination bureau of government (西臺, Xi Tai) and a post considered one for a chancellor, and Emperor Gaozong created him the Baron of Boling. As Yan's fellow chancellor Jiang Ke (the acting head of the legislative bureau (左相, Zuo Xiang)) was promoted to the chancellor post at the same time due to his battlefield achievements, a semi-derogatory couplet was written around the time stating, "The Zuo Xiang established his power over the desert, and the You Xiang established his fame over a canvass." In 670, Yan became officially the head of the legislative bureau, now with the title changed to Zhongshu Ling (中書令). He died in 673.

== Gallery ==
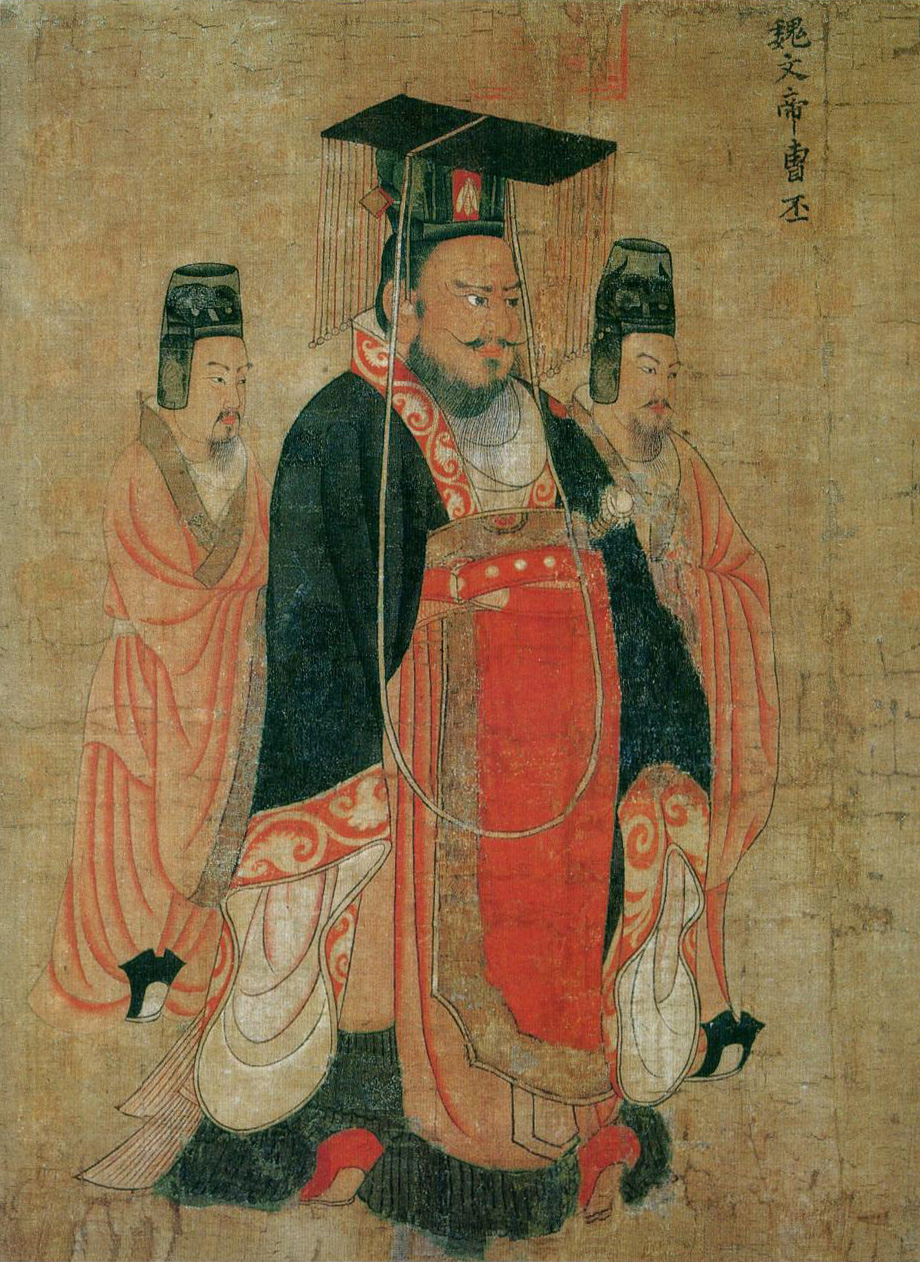
Emperor Wen of Wei

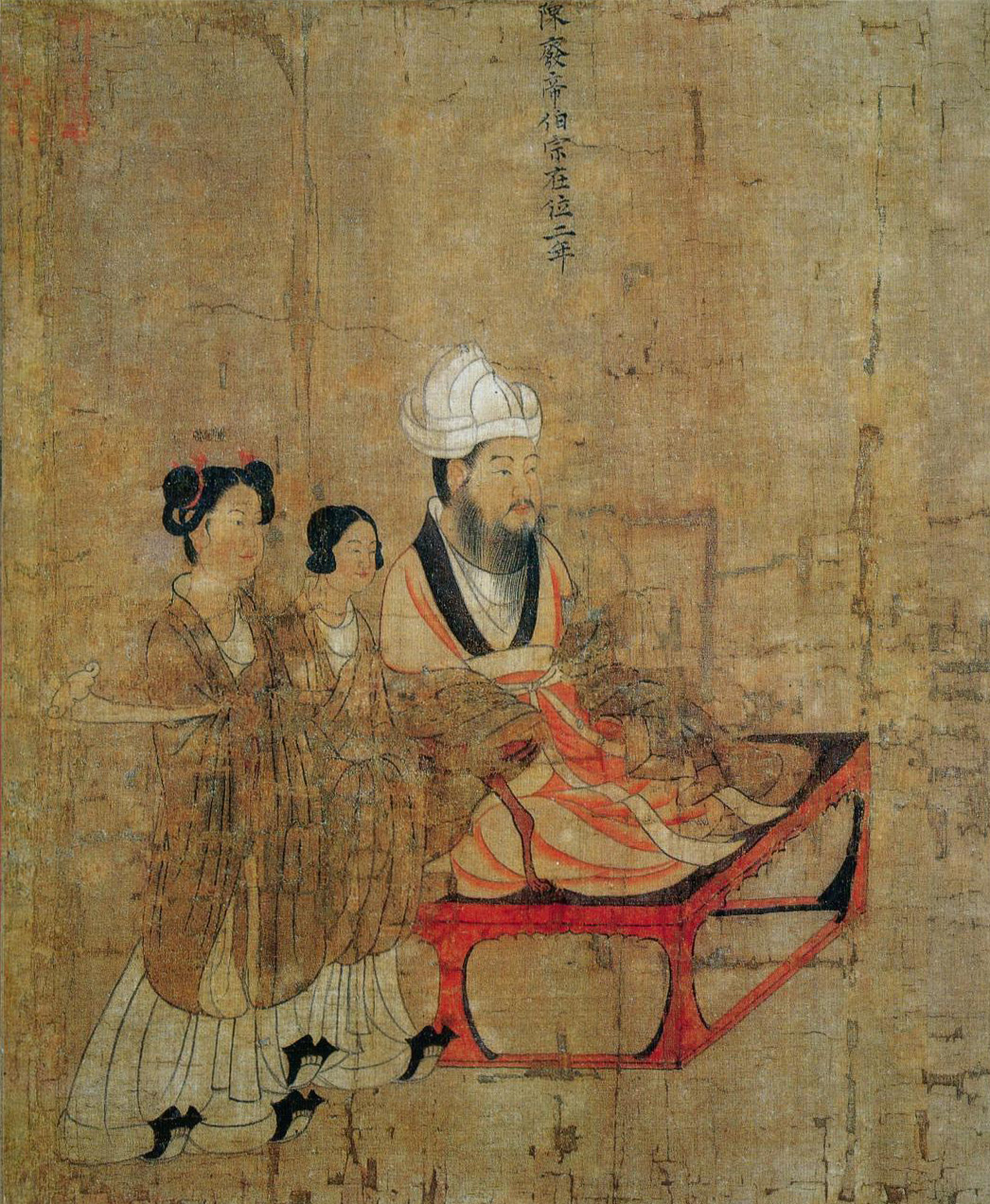
Emperor Fei of Chen

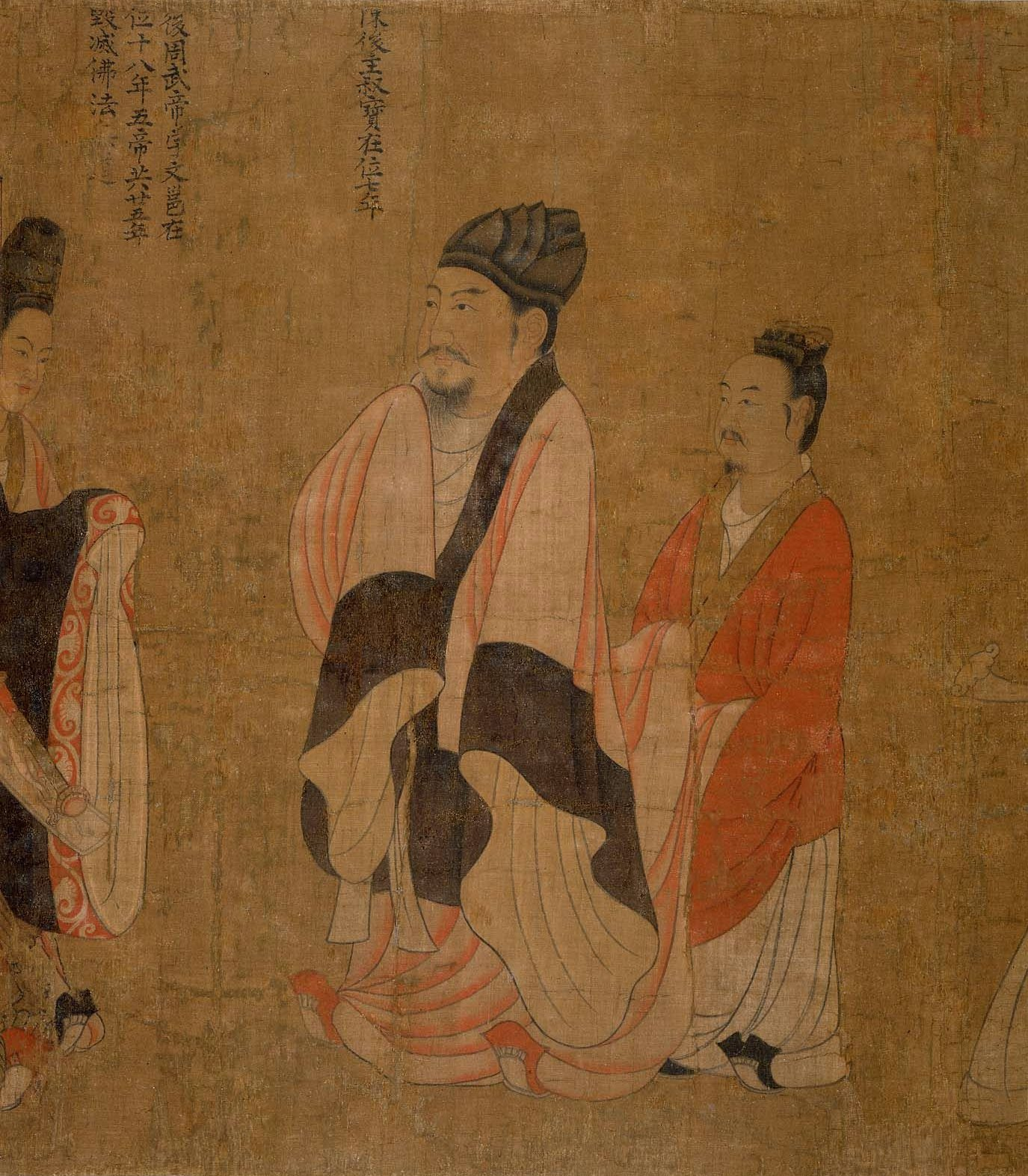
Emperor Houzhu of Chen

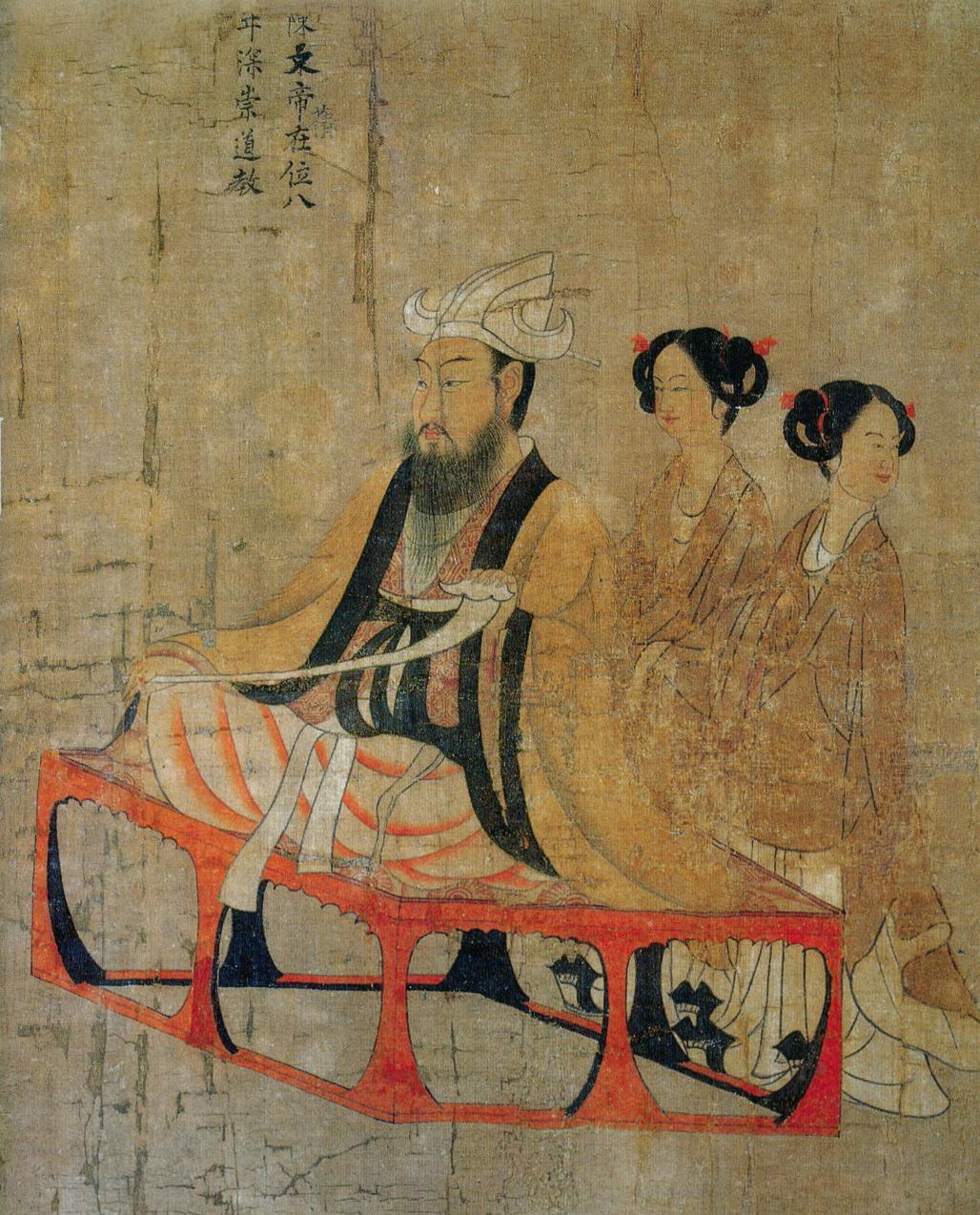
Emperor Wen of Chen

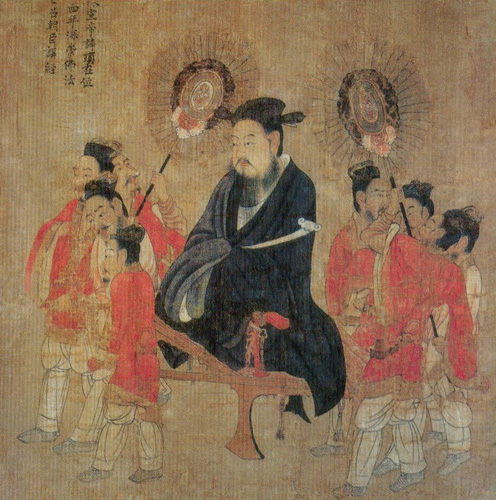
Emperor Xuan of Chen

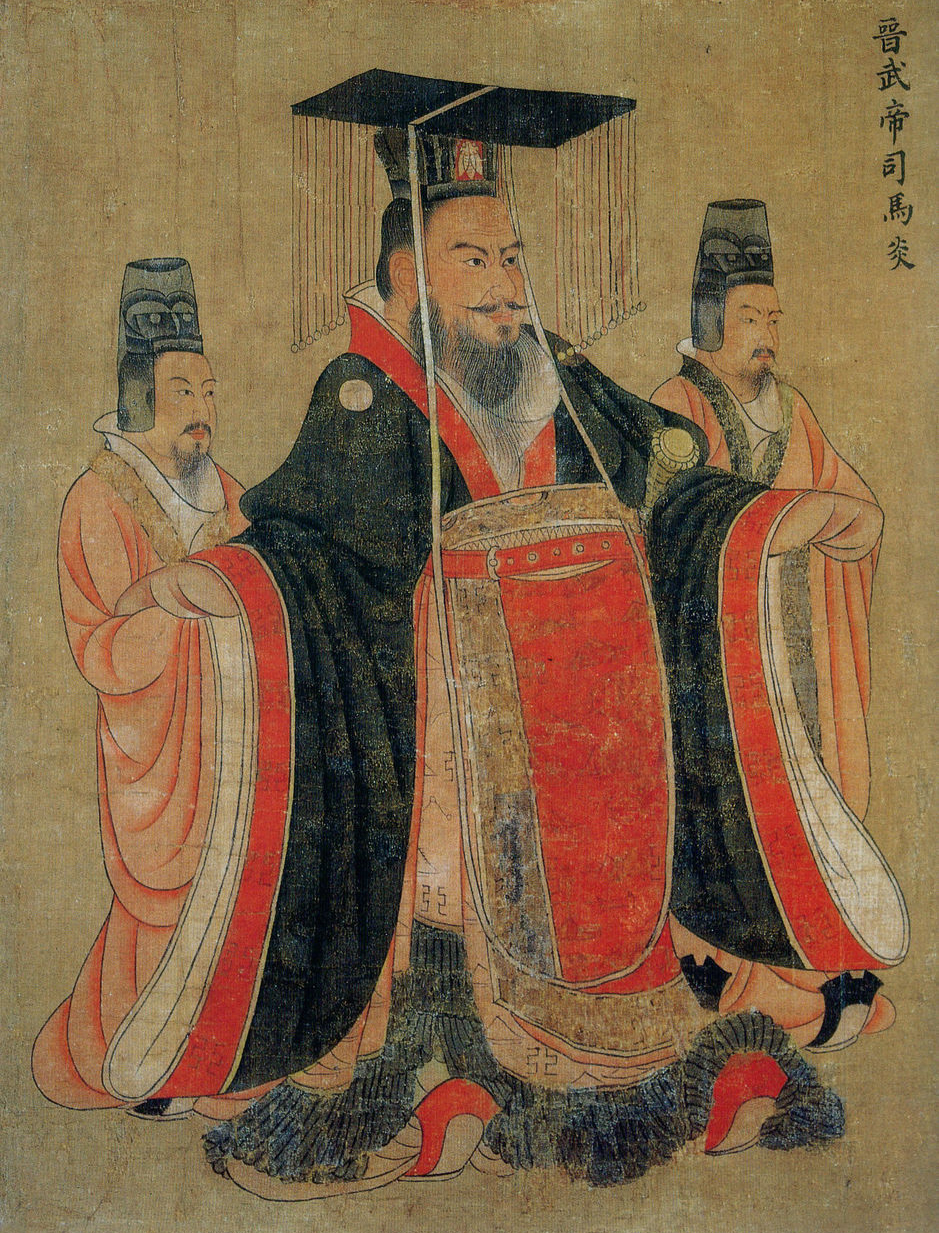
Emperor Wu of Jin

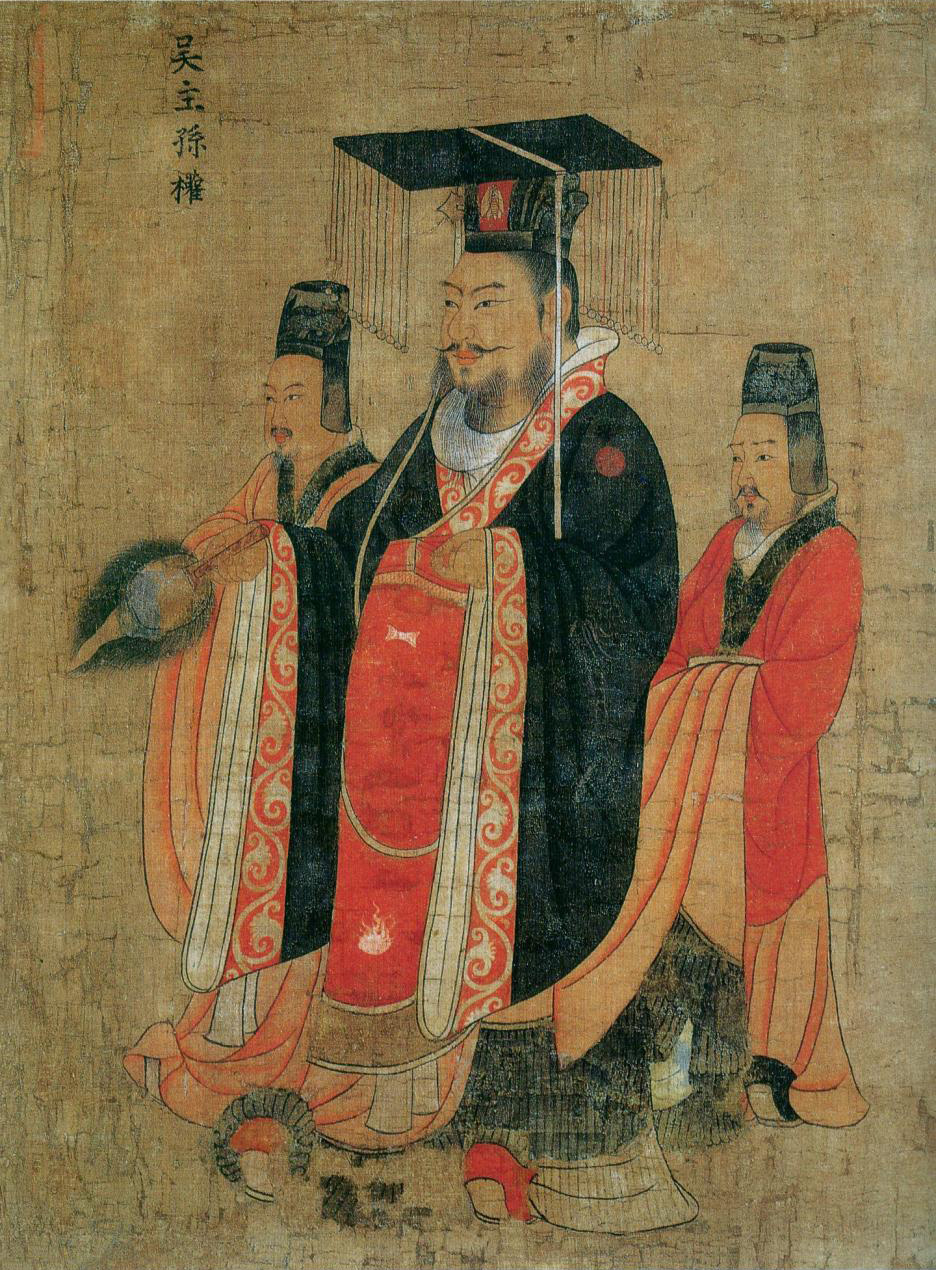
Emperor Da of Eastern Wu

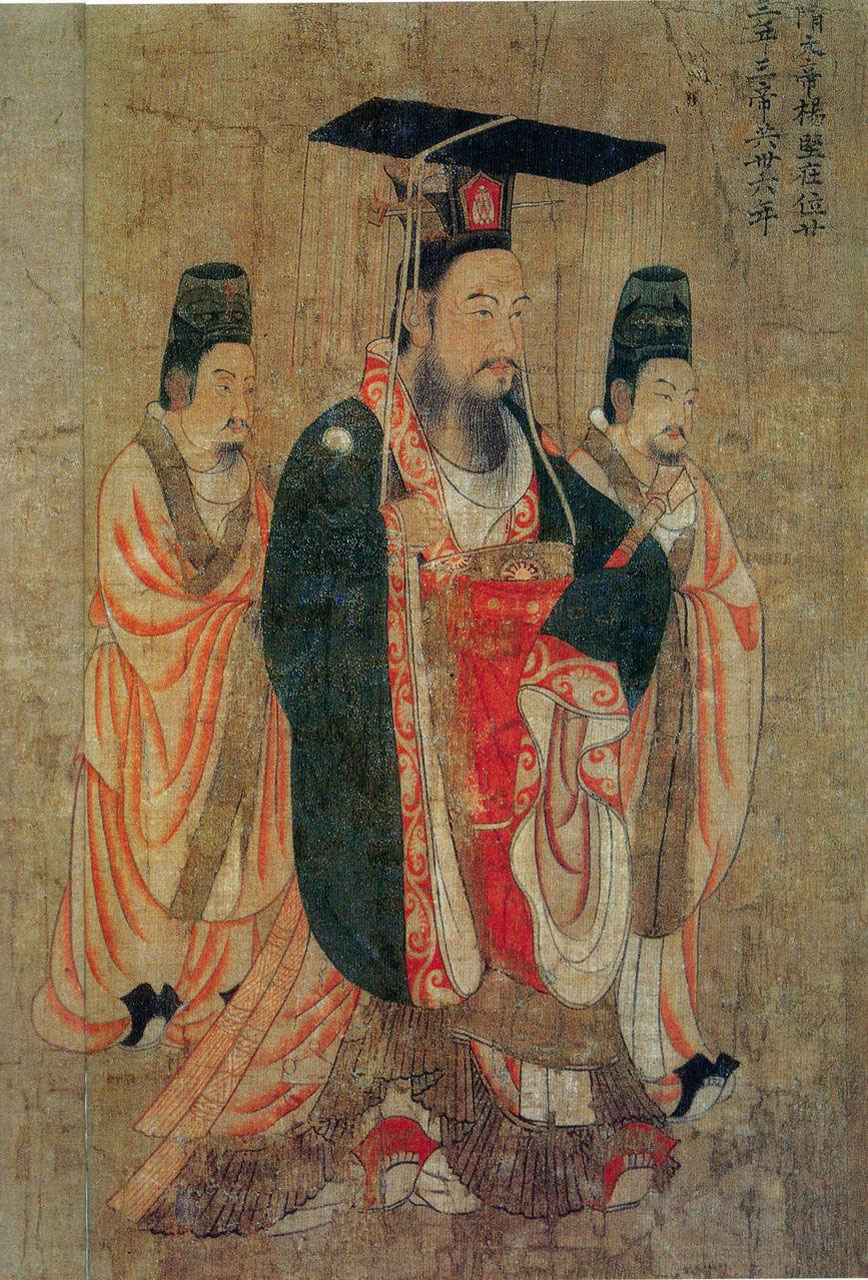
Emperor Wen of Sui

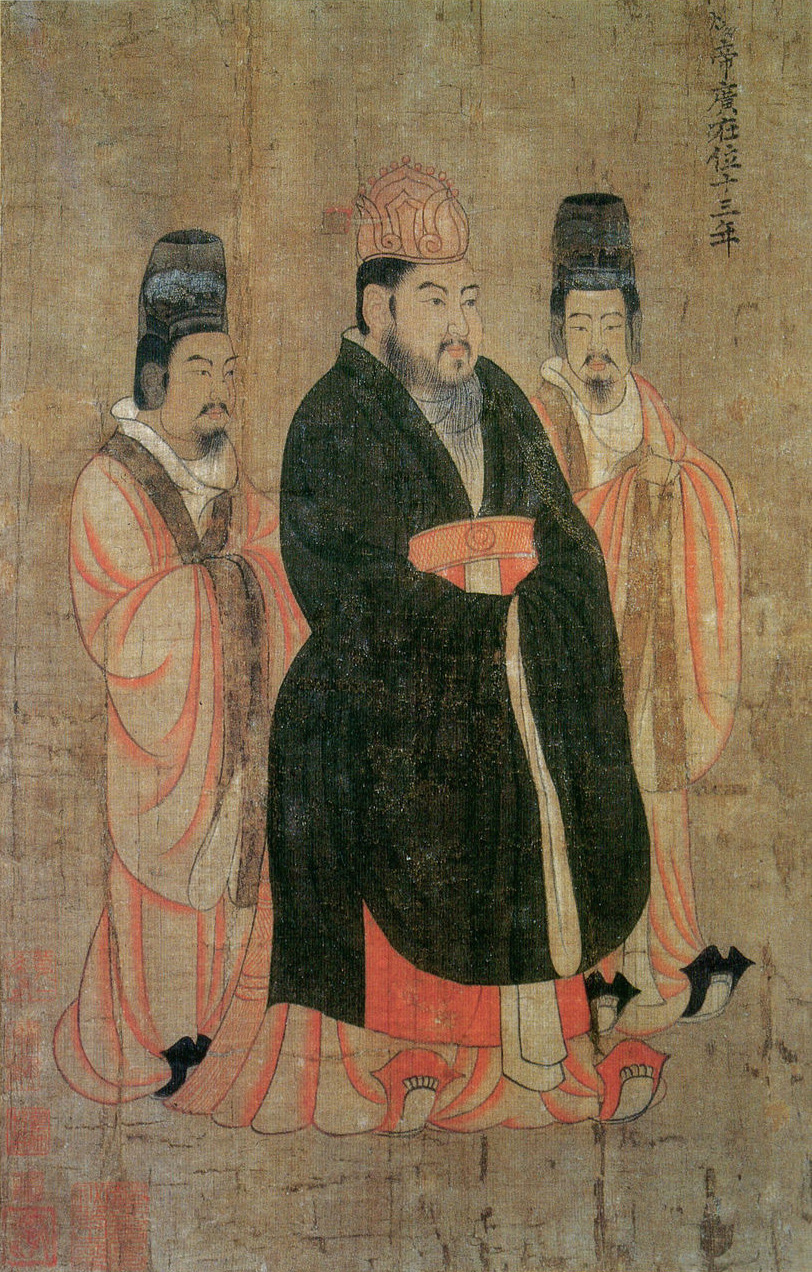
Emperor Yang of Sui

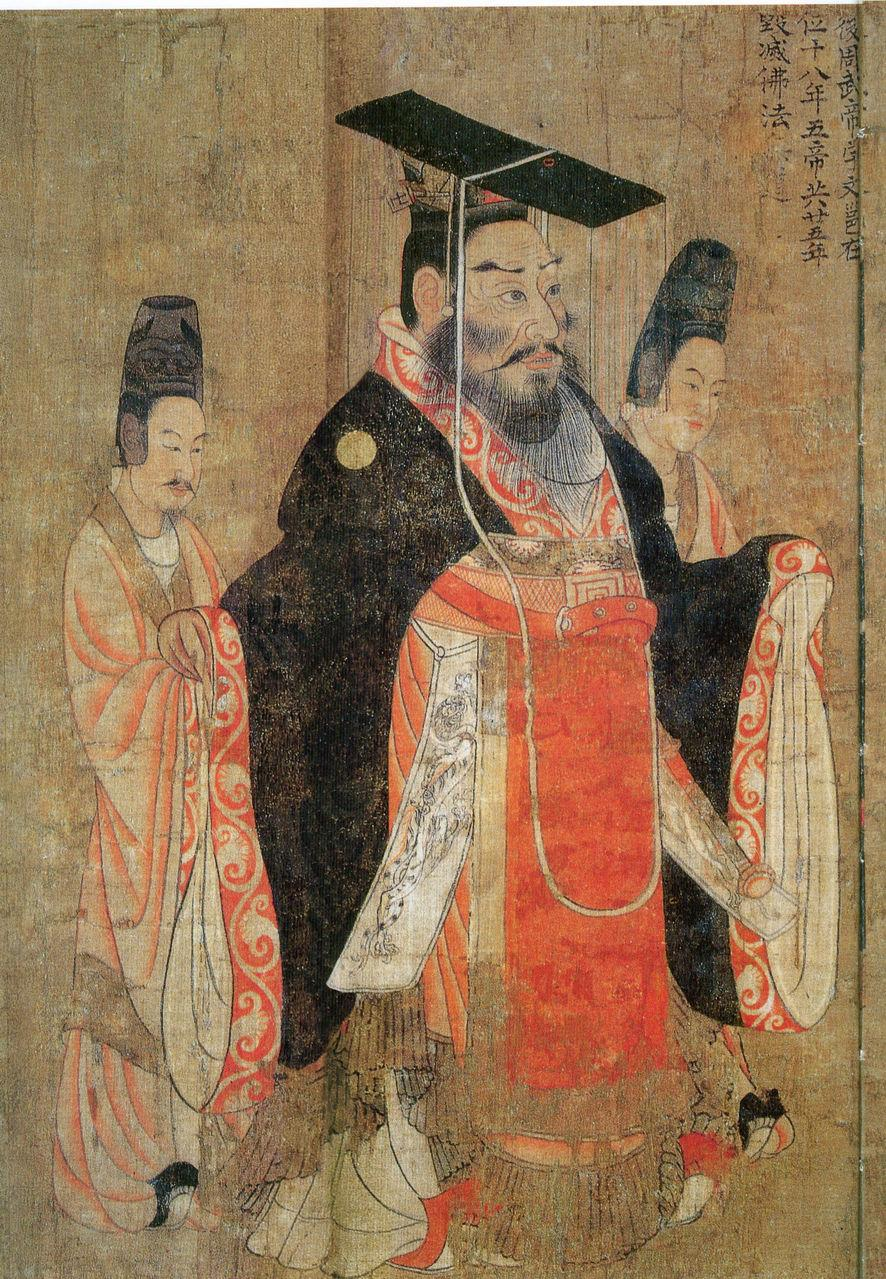
Emperor Wu of Northern Zhou

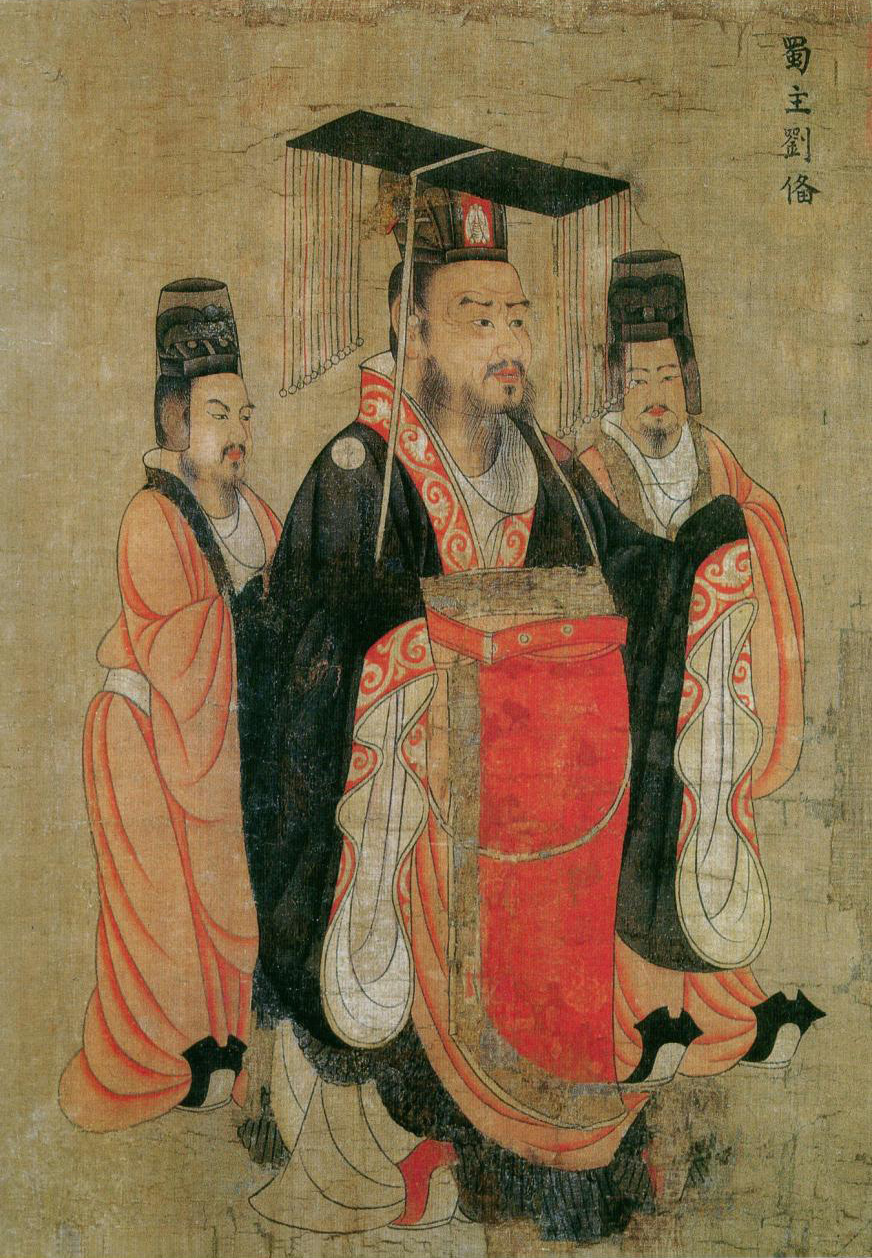
Emperor Zhaolie of Shu

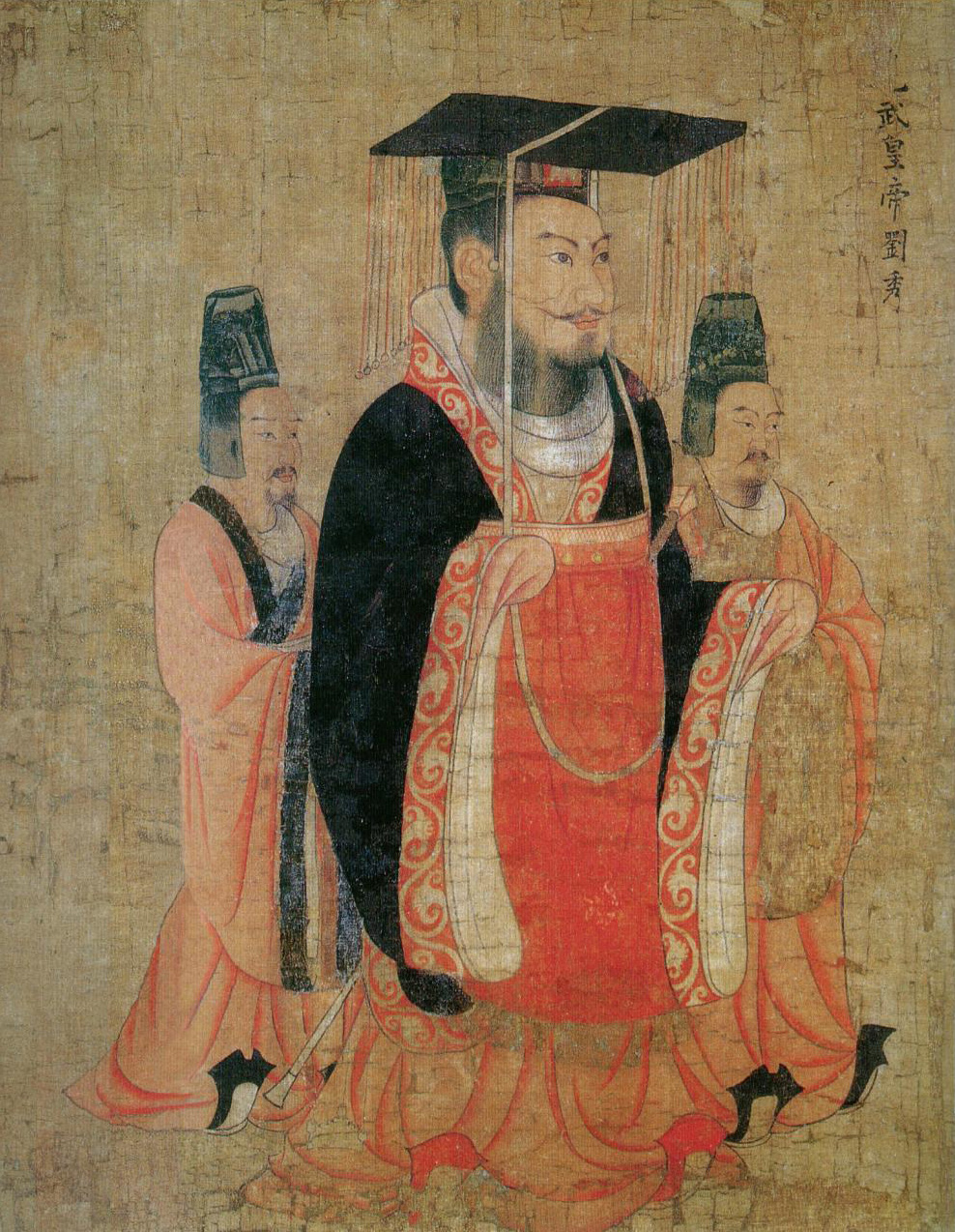
Emperor Guangwu of Han

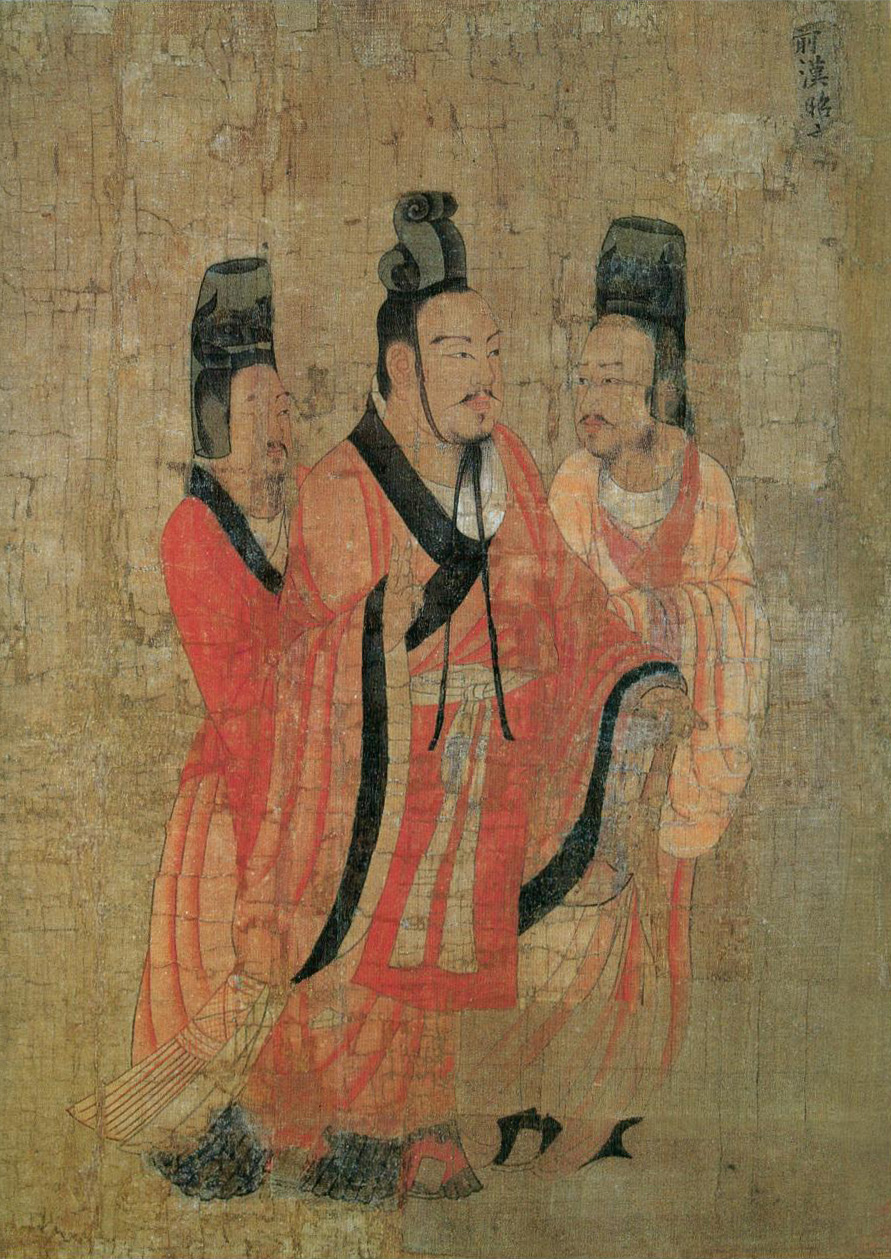
Emperor Zhao of Han

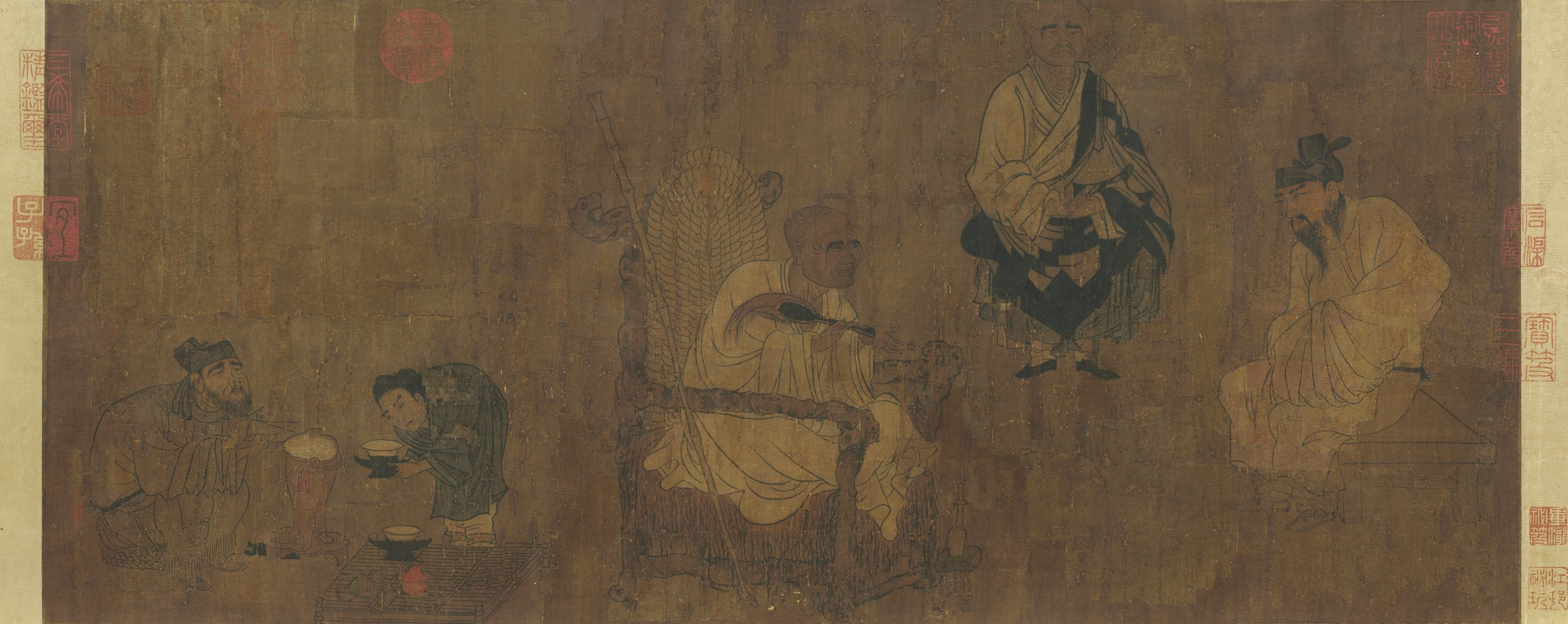
Xiao Yi Acquiring the "Orchid Pavilion Preface" by Deception (蕭翼賺蘭亭圖)

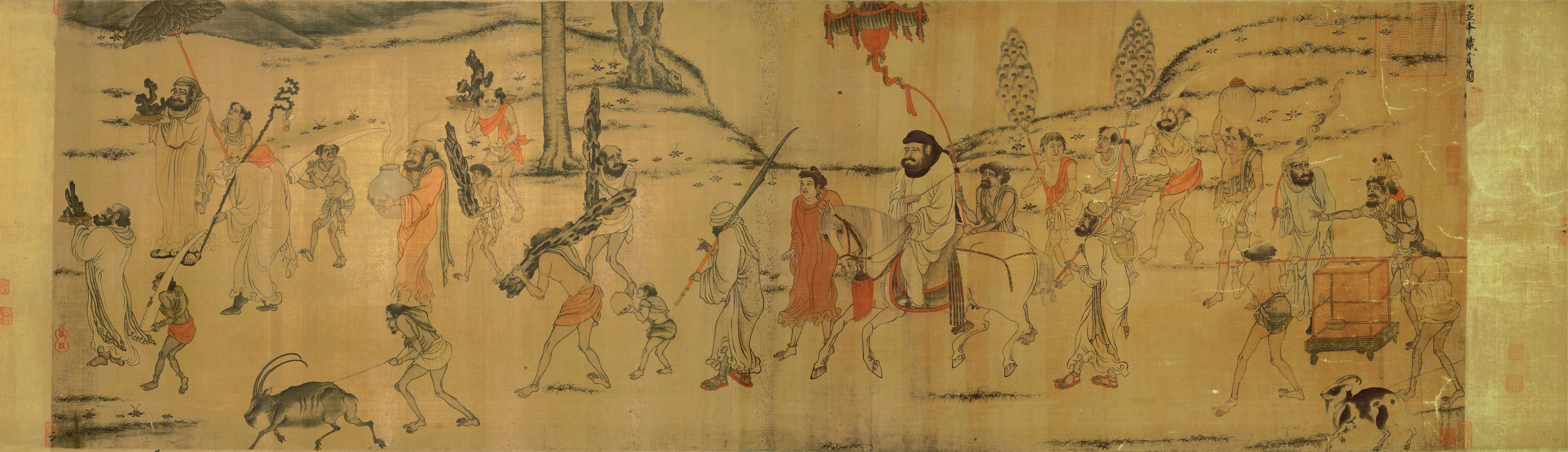
Portraits of Periodical Offering of Tang, depicting foreign envoys with tribute bearers. Song dynasty copy

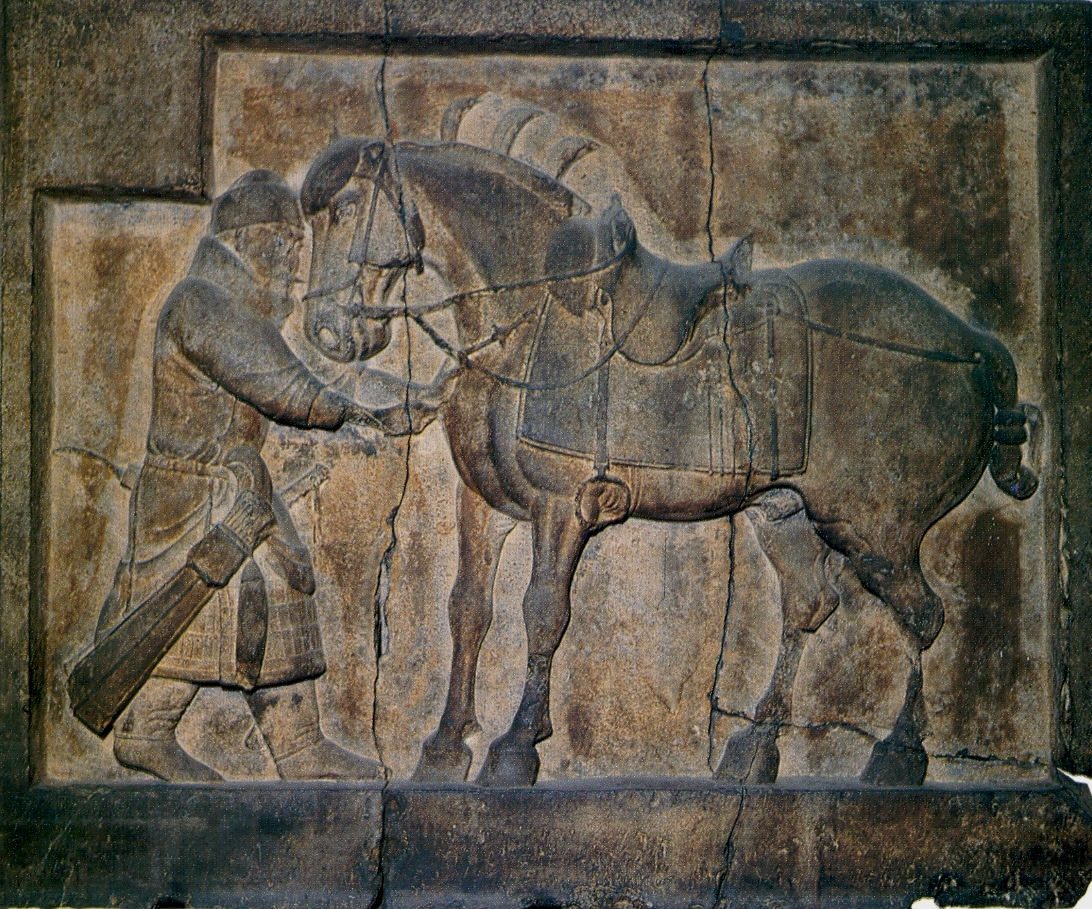
One of the Six Steeds of Zhao Mausoleum, "Saluzi" (颯露紫) or Autumn Dew
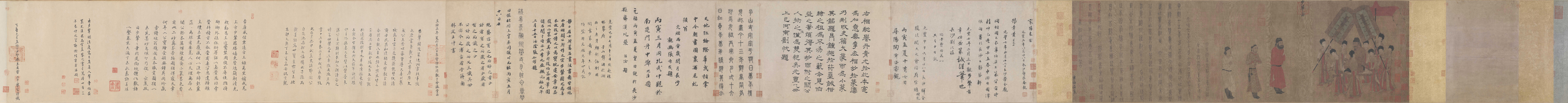
Full scroll of the Emperor Taizong Receiving the Tibetan Envoy. Song dynasty copy
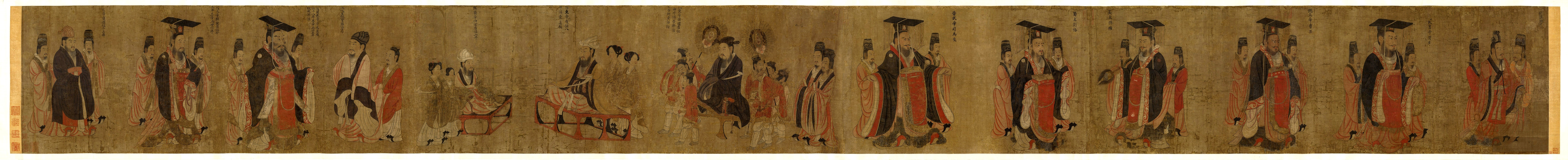
Full scroll of the Thirteen Emperors Scroll (歷代帝王圖)

== See also ==
- List of Chinese painters
- Tang dynasty art
- Chinese art
- Chinese painting
- History of Chinese art
