= Saluzi =

Chinese warhorse

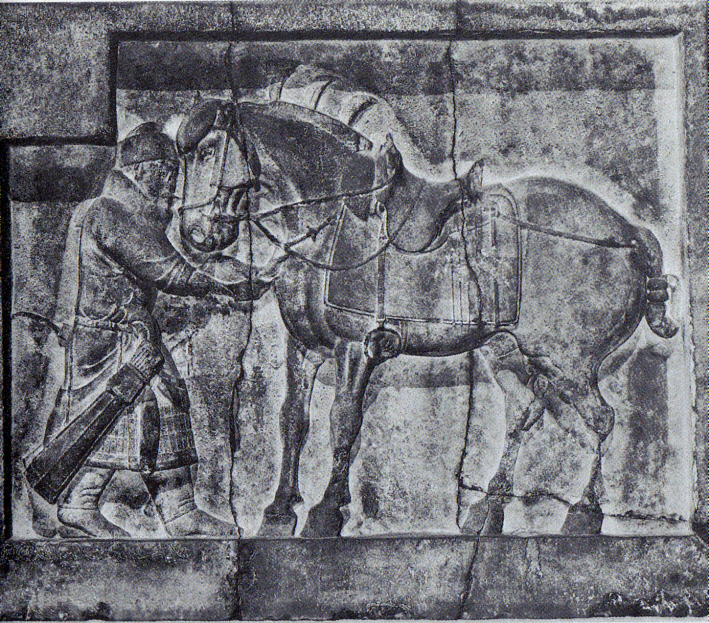
- Saluzi as portrayed on the Six Steeds of Zhao Mausoleum stone reliefs
- Sex: Male
- Country: Tang dynasty
- Owner: Emperor Taizong of Tang

Saluzi (Chinese: 颯露紫; pinyin: Sàlùzǐ) was one of Emperor Taizong's warhorses. According to historical records, he was being ridden by the emperor during a great siege when an arrow pierced the horse's breast, and the emperor was forced to exchange horses with his general, Qiu Xinggong. Saluzi is believed to be one of the horses portrayed in the stone reliefs known as the Six Steeds of Zhao Mausoleum, in which a man, possibly Qiu Xinggong, is shown removing the arrow. The six reliefs commissioned by Taizong for his mausoleum were placed outside his tomb on an altar meant for memorial ceremonies. In 1914, an American smuggler illegally exported two of the reliefs, one of which showed Saluzi. Since the stone reliefs were too large, they were destroyed into several pieces for transport, where they were shipped to the United States, where they are now in the possession of the Penn Museum.

== Sources ==
- Yang, Hong (2006). "From the Han to the Qing". Chinese Sculpture. Yale University Press. pp. 105–197. ISBN 978-0-300-10065-5.
