= Zhang Liang (Tang dynasty) =

Zhang Liang 張亮
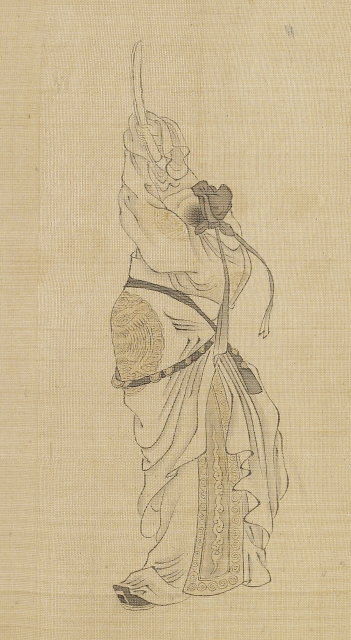
- Born: Unknown; Zhengzhou, Henan
- Died: April 17, 646; Xi'an, Shaanxi
- Occupations: Statesman, general
- Spouse: Lady Li
- Children: Zhang Yi; one daughter

Zhang Liang (traditional Chinese: 張亮; simplified Chinese: 张亮; pinyin: Zhāng Liàng; (died April 17, 646) was a Chinese general and official who served as a chancellor late in the reign of Emperor Taizong in the Tang dynasty. He was eventually accused of using witchcraft – a major taboo in imperial China – and executed in 646.

== Background and service under Li Mi ==
It is not known when Zhang Liang was born. He was from Zheng Prefecture (roughly modern Zhengzhou, Henan), and it was said that his family was not of a noble lineage. Early in his life, Zhang was a farmer, but was said to have great expectations. He was also said to be appearing to be honest and meek outwardly, but instead was treacherous inside. At the end of the Sui dynasty, the rebel ruler Li Mi conquered Zhang's home region, and Zhang followed him. Initially, he was not regarded highly by Li Mi, but after he revealed a treasonous plot to Li Mi, Li Mi believed him to be faithful, and so made him a general and had him serve under the general Xu Shiji.

In 618, Li Mi was defeated by the Sui general Wang Shichong, and he fled to Tang territory and surrendered to the Tang Empire. The parts of the territory formerly under Li Mi's control was still under Xu's control, and Xu, because Li Mi had already submitted to Tang, decided to submit to Tang as well — a decision that Zhang supported.

== During Emperor Gaozu's reign ==
After the submission of Xu Shiji (who later would be bestowed the imperial clan name of Li and be known as Li Shiji) to Tang, Zhang Liang was made the governor of Zheng Prefecture. However, around the same time, Wang Shichong captured Zheng Prefecture, and Zhang had nowhere to go, and instead took up guerilla warfare in the region. Later, based on recommendations by Li Shiji and Fang Xuanling, the Tang prince Li Shimin (the second son of Emperor Gaozu) invited Zhang to serve on his staff, and Zhang eventually became a trusted advisor.

By 626, Li Shimin was locked in an intense rivalry with his elder brother, Li Jiancheng (the Crown Prince), and he considered actions to take. As Li Shimin contemplated the possibility that he might eventually need to seize Luoyang to serve as a basis of operations against Li Jiancheng, he sent Zhang to Luoyang, with several thousand men, to secretly plan for that possibility, and to distribute wealth to get people to join Li Shimin's cause. However, this was discovered by Li Shimin's younger brother, Li Yuanji (the Prince of Qi), who supported Li Jiancheng, and Li Yuanji accused Zhang of treason. Zhang was briefly put under arrest, but under interrogation refused to reveal Li Shimin's instructions to him, and with insufficient evidence against himself, he was released and allowed to return to Luoyang. Later that year, after Li Shimin ambushed Li Jiancheng and Li Yuanji at Xuanwu Gate and killed them, he effectively forced Emperor Gaozu to create him crown prince and then yield the throne to him (as Emperor Taizong).

== During Emperor Taizong's reign ==
For Zhang's contributions, Emperor Taizong enfeoffed him as the Duke of Changping and made him the commandant at Huai Prefecture (懷州, roughly modern Jiaozuo, Henan). In 631, he was made the imperial censor, and then the minister of palace supplies. He was also created the greater title of Duke of Yu. He served several times as commandants, and in 633, when Emperor Taizong made his favorite son Li Tai, the Prince of Wei, the commandant at Xiang Prefecture (相州, roughly modern Handan, Hebei) but did not actually send Li Tai to Xiang Prefecture, Zhang was made the secretary general at Xiang Prefecture and effectively the commandant. In 637, his title was changed to Duke of Xun.

It was said that when Zhang was at a prefectural post, he would send his subordinates to secretly investigate who are the good and who are the evil people of the locale, allowing him to punish the evil and discover the good. He was also praised for suppressing the local bullies and helping the weak. However, it was also said that he divorced his wife and married a Lady Li as his new wife. Lady Li was said to be promiscuous and jealous, but was greatly favored by Zhang. When they went to Xiang Prefecture, there was a young man who sold pens for a living and was good at singing and dancing. Lady Li carried on an affair with the young man, and, falsely declaring that Zhang had previously carried on an affair with the young man's mother, encouraging Zhang to adopt the young man as a son, to be named Zhang Shenji (張慎幾) — an act opposed by Zhang's son, by his former wife, Zhang Shenwei (張慎微), to no avail. It was also said that Lady Li favored witchcraft, engaging many witches, and interfered with Zhang's administration, and from that point on, Zhang's reputation began to suffer.

In 640, Zhang was recalled to the capital Chang'an to serve as the minister of public works. In 641, he was made the head of the household for Emperor Taizong's son and crown prince, Li Chengqian, but was also sent out of the capital to serve as the commandant at Luo Prefecture (i.e., modern-day Luoyang, Henan). The general Hou Junji, who was unhappy that he had been briefly imprisoned on accusations of embezzlement after he conquered Gaochang, tried to instigate Zhang by asking him, "Who squeezed you out?" Zhang, in jest, responded, "Other than you, who can squeeze me out?" Hou responded, "I conquered a kingdom, but I ran into someone throwing a tamper tantrum big enough to overturn a house. What strength do I have to squeeze you out?" He then rolled up his sleeves and yelled, "I am so unhappy that I would rather die. Do you want to commit treason? I will commit treason with you!" Zhang secretly reported this exchange to Emperor Taizong, but Emperor Taizong pointed out that this was a private conversation with no corroboration, and took no action on it. After Hou was revealed to have plotted with Li Chengqian to overthrow Emperor Taizong in 643, Li Chengqian was deposed and exiled, while Hou was executed. Because Zhang had previously warned Emperor Taizong about Hou, Emperor Taizong rewarded him by recalling him to the capital to serve as the minister of justice and also bestowing him the additional designation of Canyu Chaozheng (參豫朝政), making him a de facto chancellor. (Earlier in 643, when Emperor Taizong commissioned the Portraits at Lingyan Pavilion to commemorate the 24 great contributors to Tang rule, Zhang's was one of the portraits commissioned.)

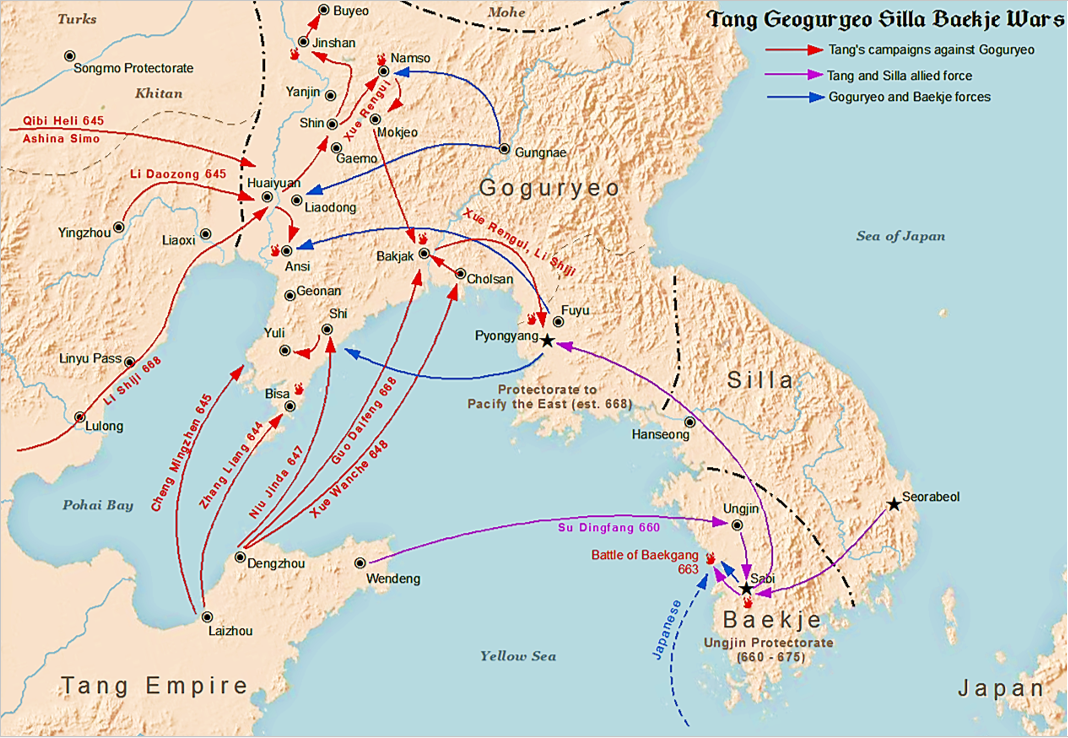
Zhang Liang's campaign during the Tang-Goguryeo war.

In 644, when Emperor Taizong planned a major campaign against Goguryeo, Zhang repeatedly advised against it, but Emperor Taizong did not accept his advice. Zhang himself thereafter requested to be a general on the campaign, and he was put in charge of the 40,000 soldier fleet that would depart from Lai Prefecture to head directly toward the Goguryeo capital Pyongyang. In summer 645, Zhang's fleet attacked and captured Bisa (卑沙, in modern Dalian, Liaoning), and then headed to the mouth of the Yalu River in anticipation of the army also arriving there. When his forces subsequently marched past Geonan (建安, in modern Yingkou, Liaoning), Goguryeo forces made a surprise attack against his forces—shocking him so much that he froze, but his failure to react was interpreted by his own soldiers to be a show of resolve and bravery, and his assistant Zhang Jinshu (張金樹) subsequently counterattacked and repelled the Goguryeo attack. Later, however, when Emperor Taizong's own main forces became bogged down in sieging Ansi (安市, in modern Anshan, Liaoning) and was eventually forced to abandon the offensive with winter arriving, Zhang withdrew as well.

== Death ==
Meanwhile, over the years, Zhang had taken some 500 men and called them his sons. He had also become very trusting of sorcerers named Cheng Gongying (程公穎) and Gongsun Chang (公孫常), whose brother Gongsun Jie (公孫節) was one of Zhang's "sons." Both Cheng and Gongsun flattered Zhang by suggesting that one day he would be emperor. In 646, one Chang Dexuan (常德玄) reported to Emperor Taizong these things and suggested that Zhang was plotting treason. Emperor Taizong had the chancellor Ma Zhou investigate, and, although Cheng and Gongsun Chang admitted the allegations, Zhang denied the allegations, stating that Cheng and Gongsun only admitted because they wanted to be spared. Emperor Taizong, however, believed that Zhang was plotting with his 500 "sons." Most officials also advocated Zhang's death; only Li Daoyu (李道裕) the deputy minister of construction opposed, stating, "There is no firm evidence that Zhang was committing treason, and he should not be put to death." Emperor Taizong executed Zhang and Cheng, but later regretted it, and due to his regrets, he promoted Li Daoyu to the post of deputy minister of justice.

== Notes and references ==
- Old Book of Tang, vol. 69.
- New Book of Tang, vol. 94.
- Zizhi Tongjian, vols. 191, 194, 196, 197, 198.
