= Daming Palace =

Archaeological site and museum in China

Daming Palace National Heritage Park
- 大明宫国家遗址公园
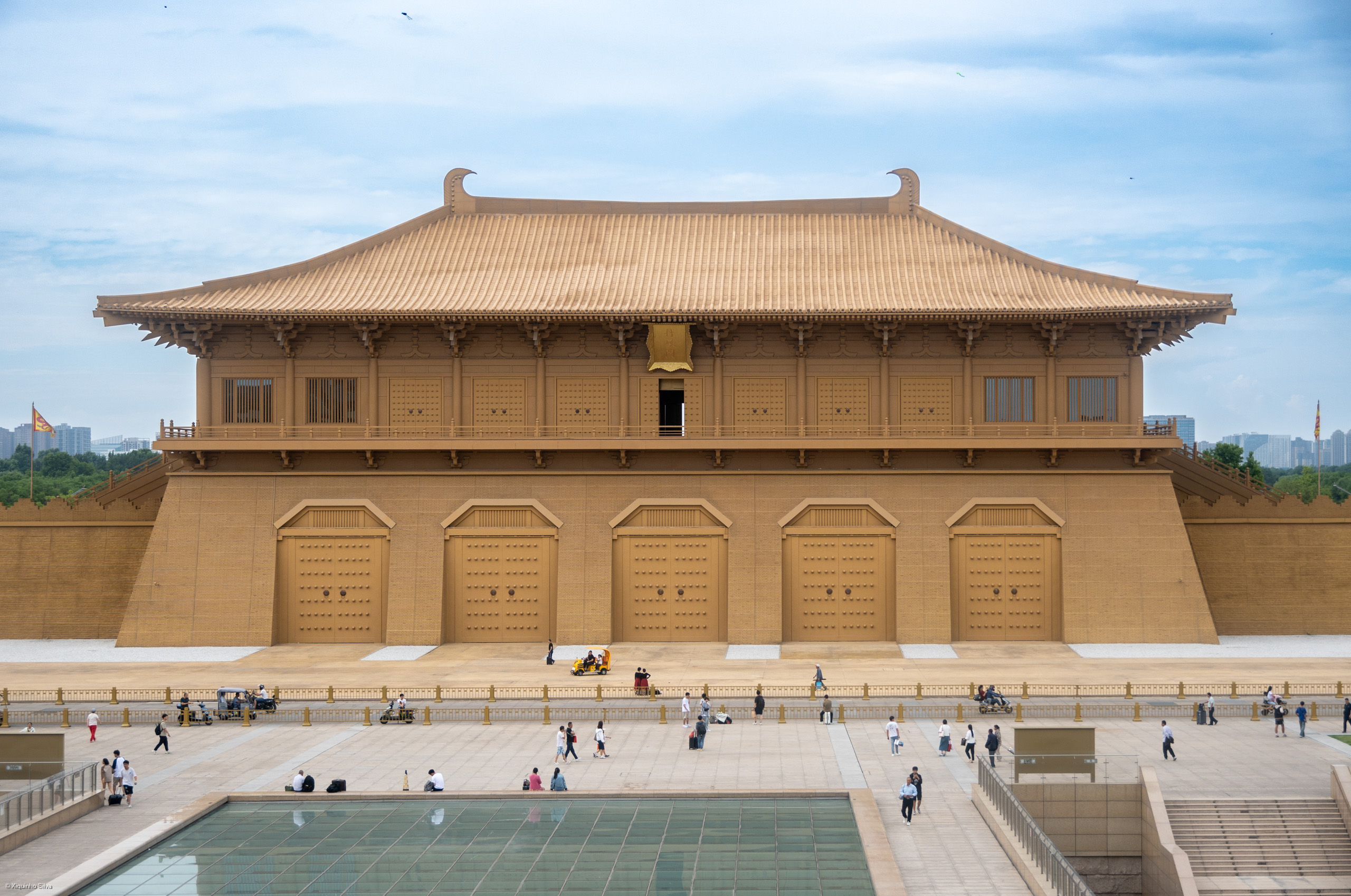
- The reconstructed Danfeng Gate, housing and conserving the on-site ruins of the original gate of the Daming Palace
- Established: 1 October 2010
- Location: Xi'an, Shaanxi, China
- Coordinates: 34°17′29″N 108°57′34″E
- Type: Archaeological site and history museum

Daming Palace
- Simplified Chinese: 大明宫
- Traditional Chinese: 大明宮
- Literal meaning: "Palace of Great Brilliance"
Transcriptions
Standard Mandarin
- Hanyu Pinyin: Dàmíng Gōng
- IPA: [tâ.mǐŋ kʊ́ŋ]

Daming Palace National Heritage Park
- Simplified Chinese: 大明宫国家遗址公园
- Traditional Chinese: 大明宮國家遺址公園
Transcriptions
Standard Mandarin
- Hanyu Pinyin: dàmíng gōng guójiā yízhǐ gōngyuán

The Daming Palace was the imperial palace complex of the Tang dynasty, located in its capital Chang'an. It served as the imperial residence of the Tang emperors for more than 220 years. Today, it is designated as a national heritage site of China, and part of the UNESCO World Heritage Site "Silk Roads: the Routes Network of Chang'an-Tianshan Corridor". The area is located northeast of present-day Xi'an, Shaanxi Province.

== Name ==
The palace was originally known as Yong'an Palace but was renamed to Daming Palace in 635. In 662, after renovations to the palace, it was renamed Penglai Palace. In 670, it was renamed Hanyuan Palace or Yuan Palace. Eventually, in 701, the name was changed to Daming Palace again.

== History ==
The former royal residence was the Taiji Palace (太極宮), built in the previous Sui dynasty.

The palace was built in the middle of the "Forbidden Garden" and outside the capital city. The architecture centers on the audience hall and the imperial courtyard, both built on stepped terraces.

In 632, chancellor Ma Zhou charged that the retired Emperor Gaozu was living in Da'an Palace (大安宮) to the west, which he considered an inhospitable place as it was built on low-lying lands of Chang'an that was plagued by dampness and heat during the summer. According to him, ever since Emperor Taizong moved to the countryside during the summers, his retired father was left behind in Chang'an to suffer in the summer heat. However, his father would always decline any invitation from Emperor Taizong to spend the summer together. Ever since the bloody palace coup of the Xuanwu Gate Incident in 626, it seemed that father and son had drifted apart to an extent that their relationship never healed.

In 634, Emperor Taizong launched the construction of the Daming Palace at Longshou Plateau. He ordered the construction of the summer palace for his retired father, Emperor Gaozu, as an act of filial piety. However, Emperor Gaozu grew ill and never witnessed the palace's completion before his death in 635, and construction halted thereafter.

Empress Wu commissioned the court architect Yan Liben to design the palace in 660 and construction commenced once again in 662. In 663, the construction of the palace was completed under the reign of Emperor Gaozong. Emperor Gaozong had launched the extension of the palace with the construction of the Hanyuan Hall in 662, which was finished in 663. On 5 June 663, the imperial family began to relocate from the Taiji Palace into the yet to be completed Daming Palace, which became the new seat of the imperial court and political center of the empire.

== Layout and function ==
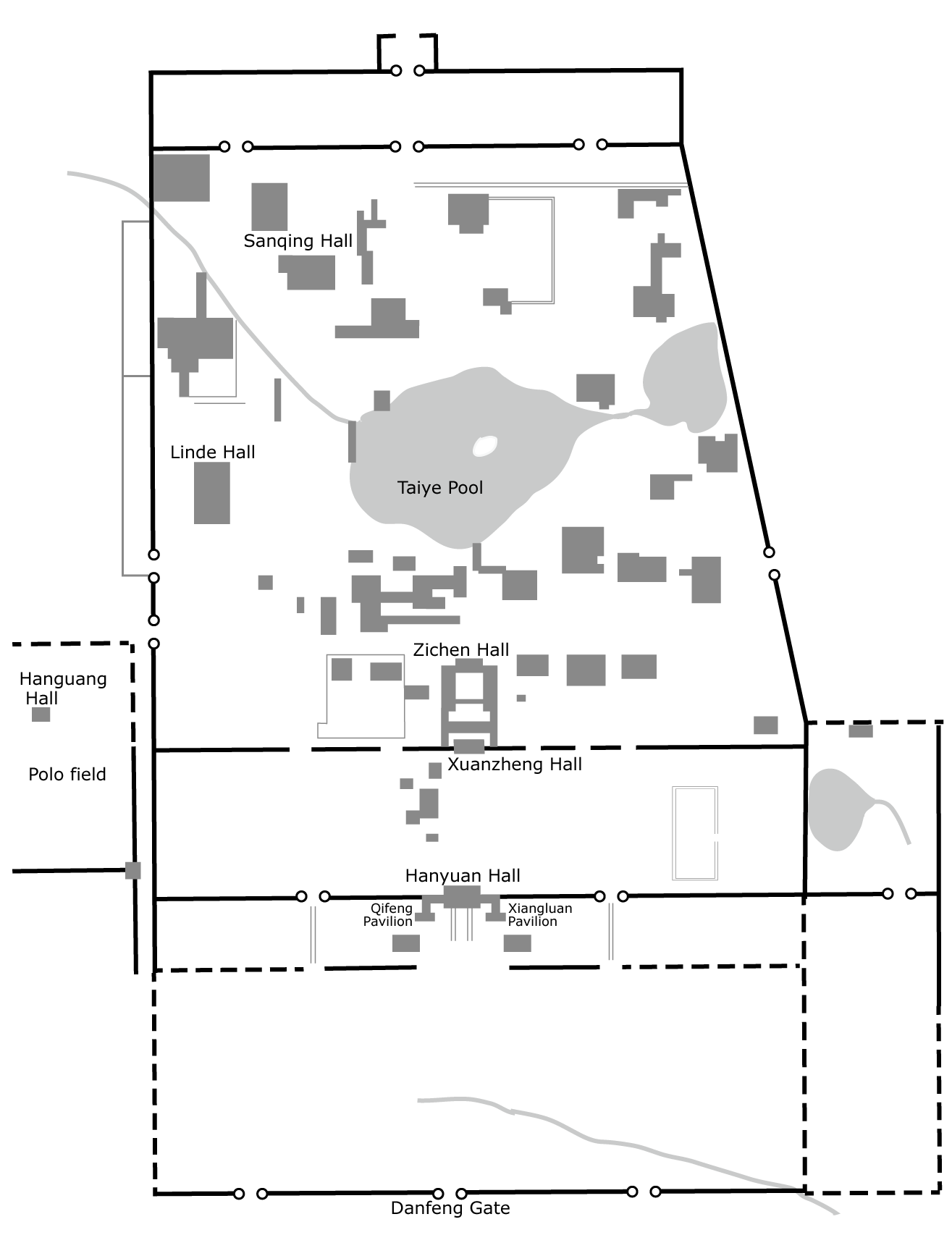
Map of ruins

Beginning from the south and ending in the north, on the central axis, stand the Hanyuan Hall, the Xuanzheng Hall, and the Zichen Hall. These halls were historically known as the "Three Great Halls" and were respectively part of the outer, middle, and inner court. The central southern entrance of the Daming Palace is the Danfeng Gate. The gate consisted of five doorways.

The present site covers more than 4,800 mu, making it 3.5 times more expansive than the Forbidden City, 3 times more than Versailles, and 13 times more than the Louvre.

=== Outer court ===
After passing through the Danfeng Gate, there is a square of 630 metres (2,070 ft) long with at the end the Hanyuan Hall. The Hanyuan Hall was connected to pavilions by corridors, namely the Xiangluan Pavilion in the east and the Qifeng Pavilion in the west. The pavilions were composed of three outward-extending sections of the same shape but different size that were connected by corridors. The elevated platform of the Hanyuan Hall is approximately 15 metres (49 ft) high, 200 metres (660 ft) wide, and 100 metres (330 ft) long. The Hanyuan Hall, where many state ceremonies were conducted, would serve as the main hall for hosting foreign ambassadors during diplomatic exchanges.

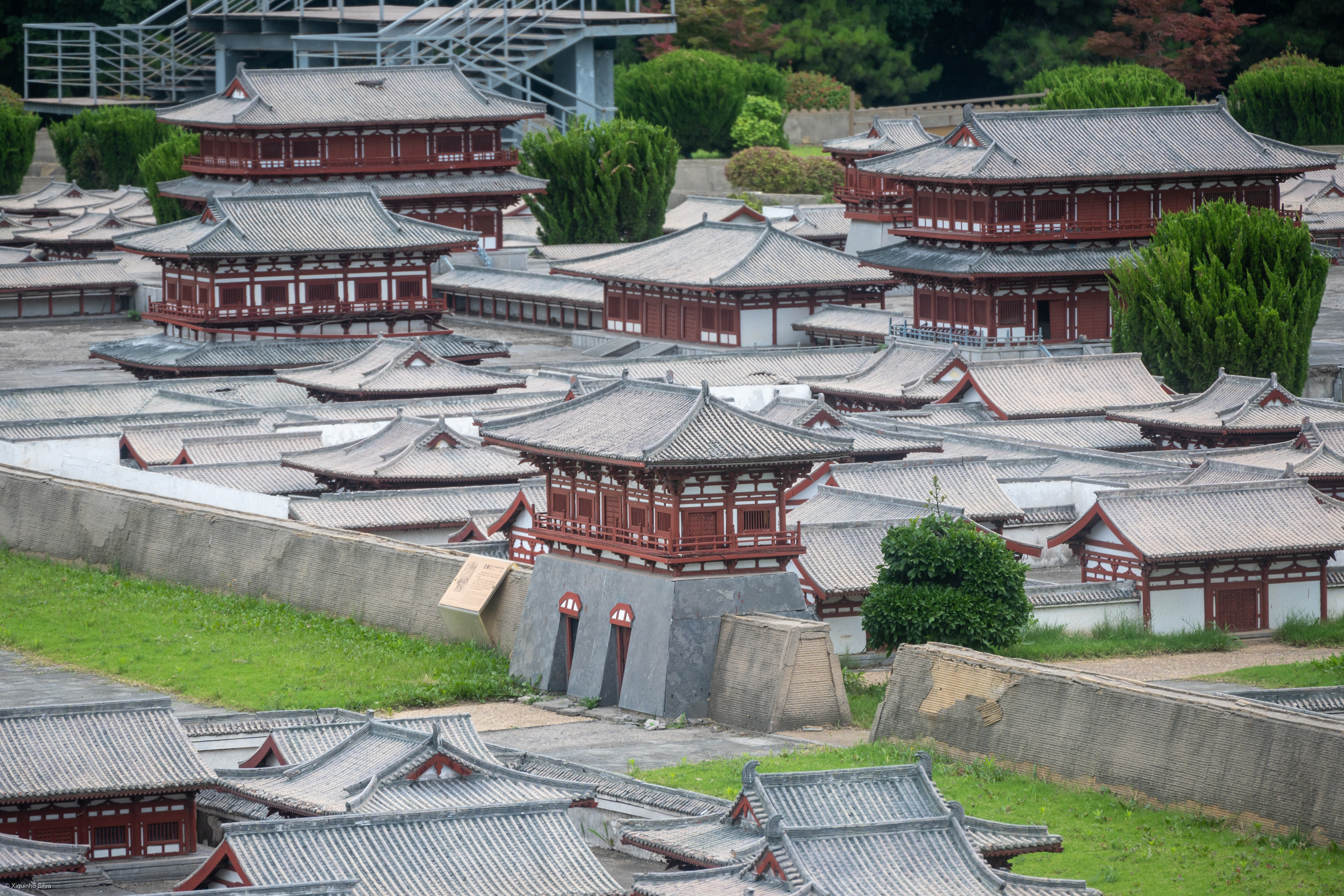
Model of the Daming palace grounds

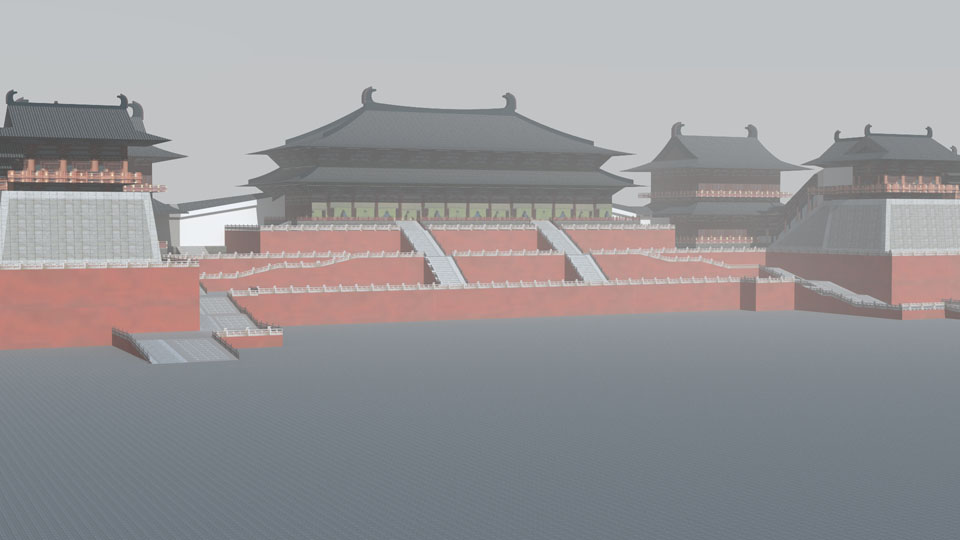
Reconstruction model of Hanyuan Hall

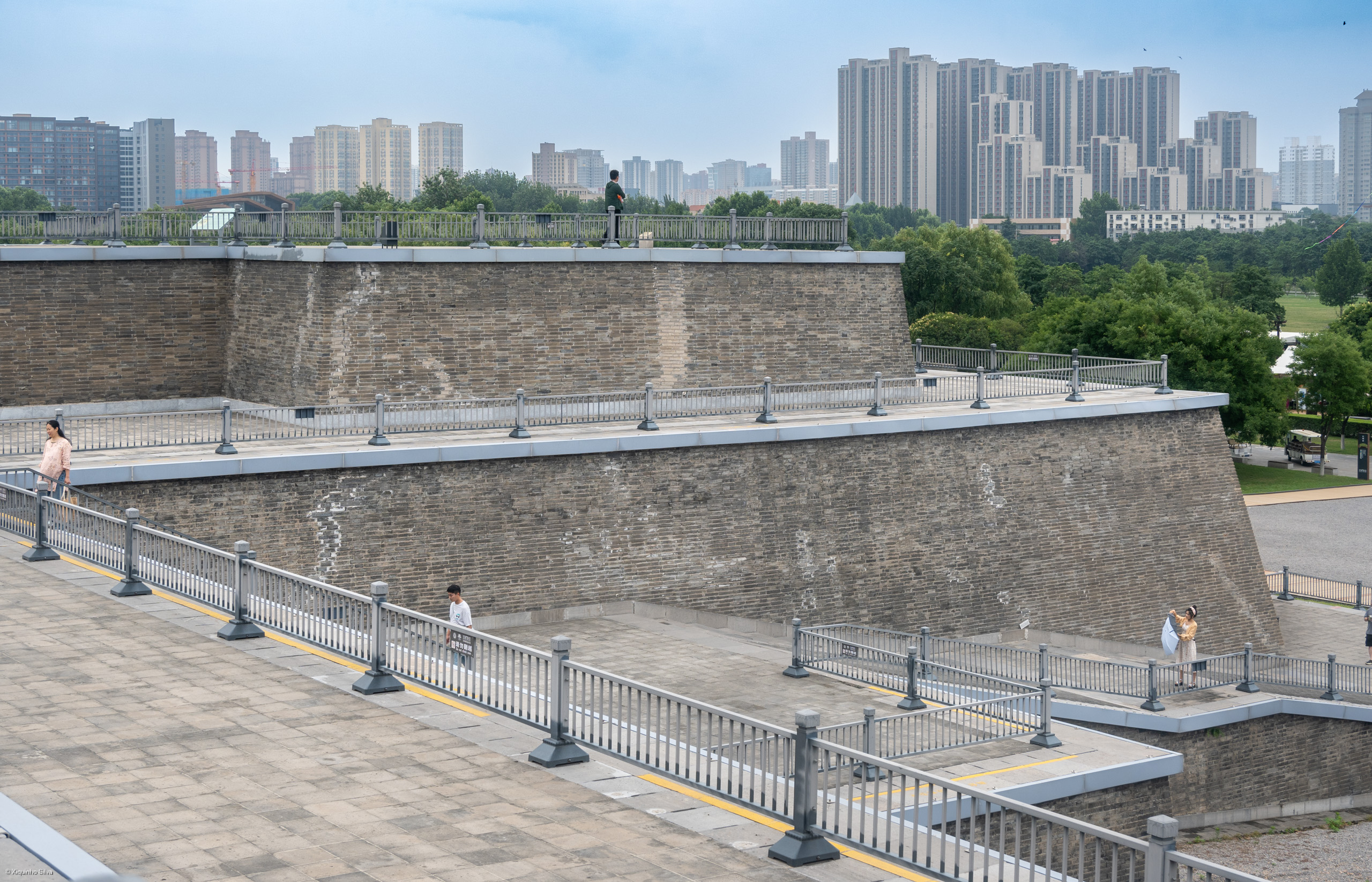
Hanyuan Hall's platform

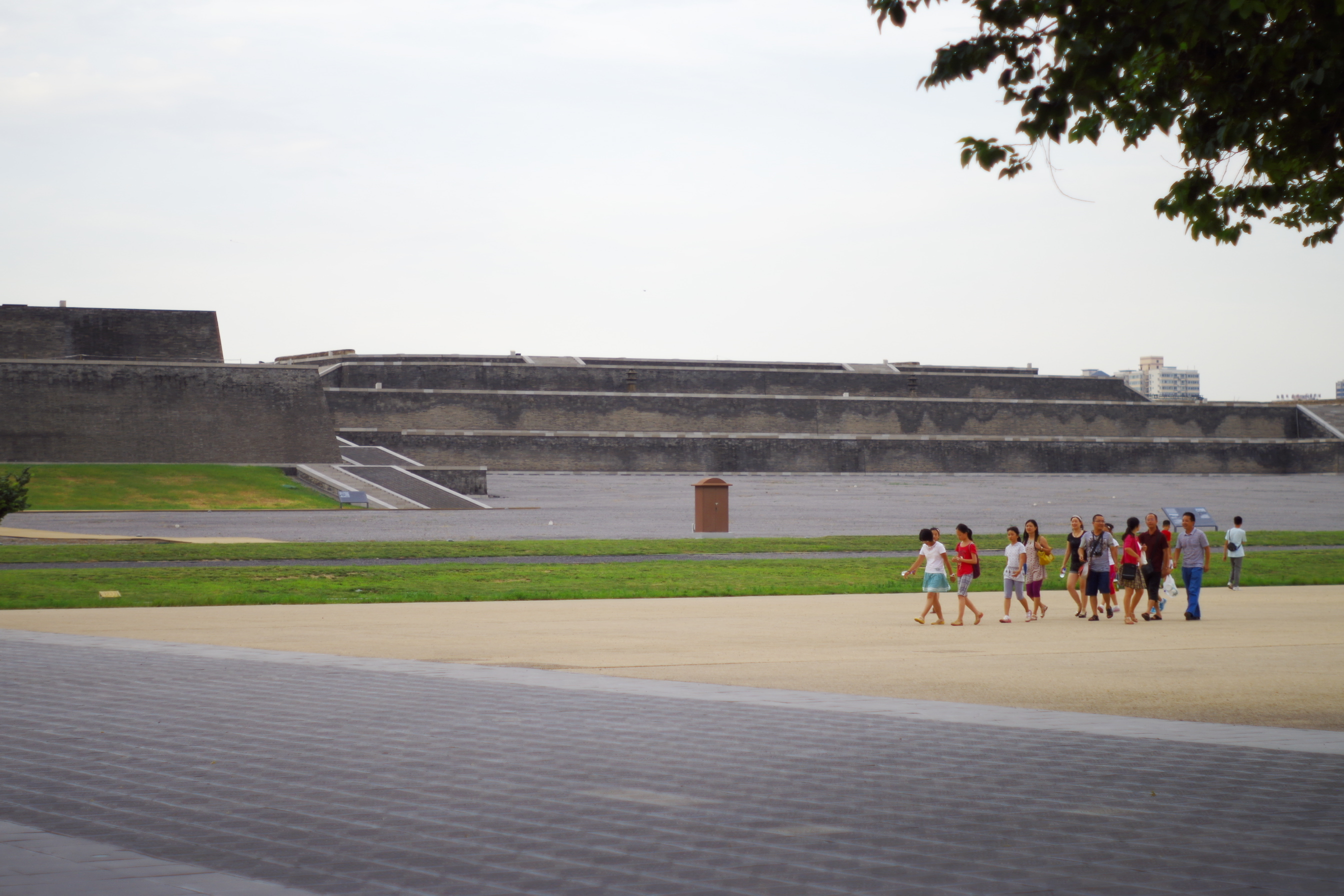
Hanyuan Hall's platform

=== Middle court ===
The Xuanzheng Hall is located at a distance of about 300 metres (980 ft) north of the Hanyuan Hall. State affairs were usually conducted in this hall. The office of the secretariat was located to the west of the Xuanzheng Hall and the office of the chancellery was located to the east. From this area, structured in a Three Departments and Six Ministries system, the Department of State Affairs, the Chancellery, and the Secretariat handled the central management of the Tang empire.

=== Inner court ===
The Zichen Hall, located in the inner court, is approximately 95 metres (312 ft) north of the Xuanzheng Hall. It housed the central government offices. For officials, it was considered a great honor to be summoned to the Zichen Hall. The Taiye Pool, also known as the Penglai Pool, is north of the Zichen Hall. The former gardens that surround the pond and island have been recreated, based on the historical record, with peony, chrysanthemum, plum, rose, bamboo, almond, peach, and persimmon gardens.

The Linde Hall is located to the west of the lake. It served as a place for banquets, performances, and religious rites. It consisted of three halls—a front, middle, and rear hall—adjacent to each other. An imperial park could be found north of the palace complex. The Sanqing Hall was located in the northeast corner the Daming Palace and served as a Taoist temple for the imperial family.

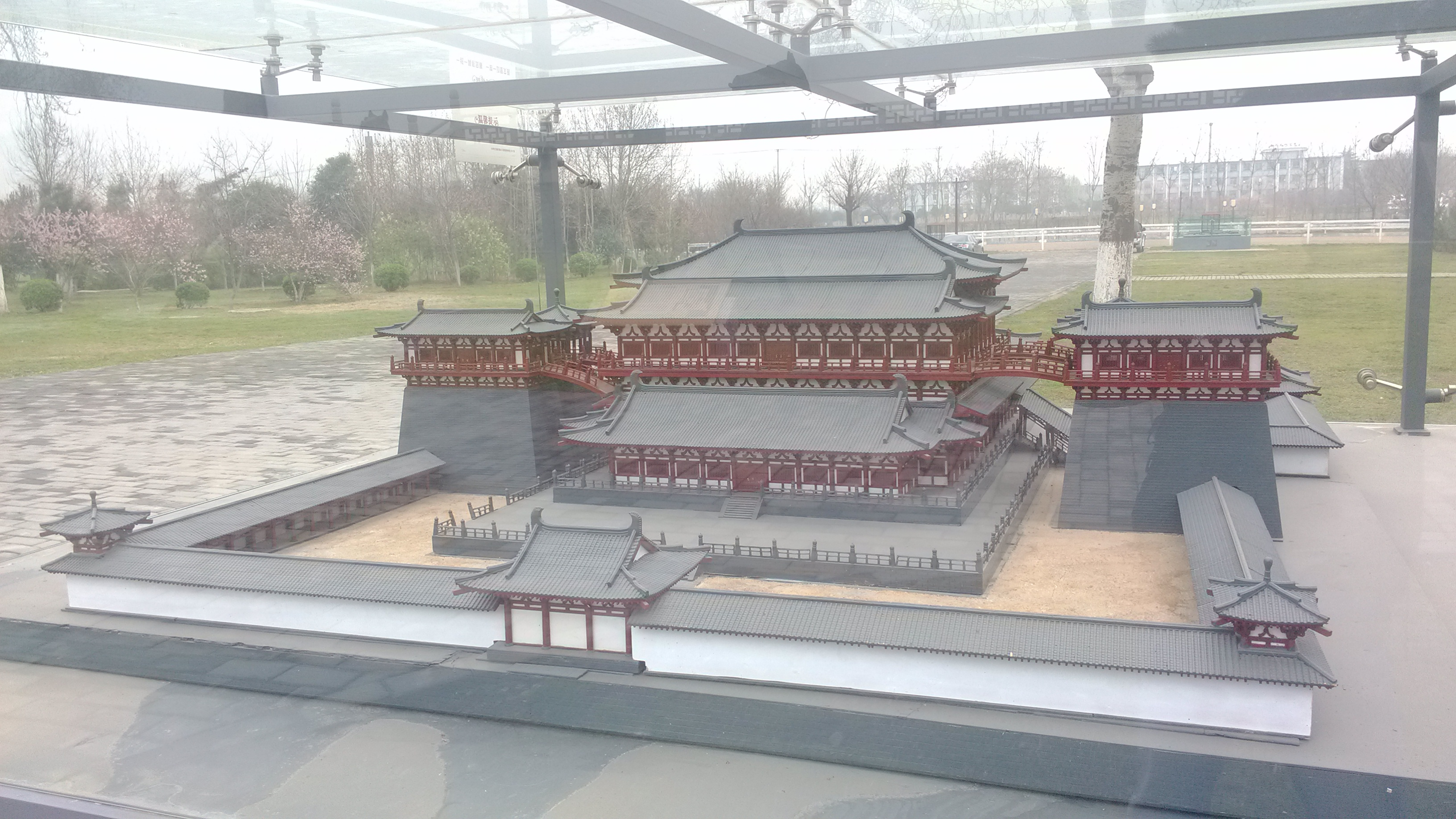
Model of the Linde Hall

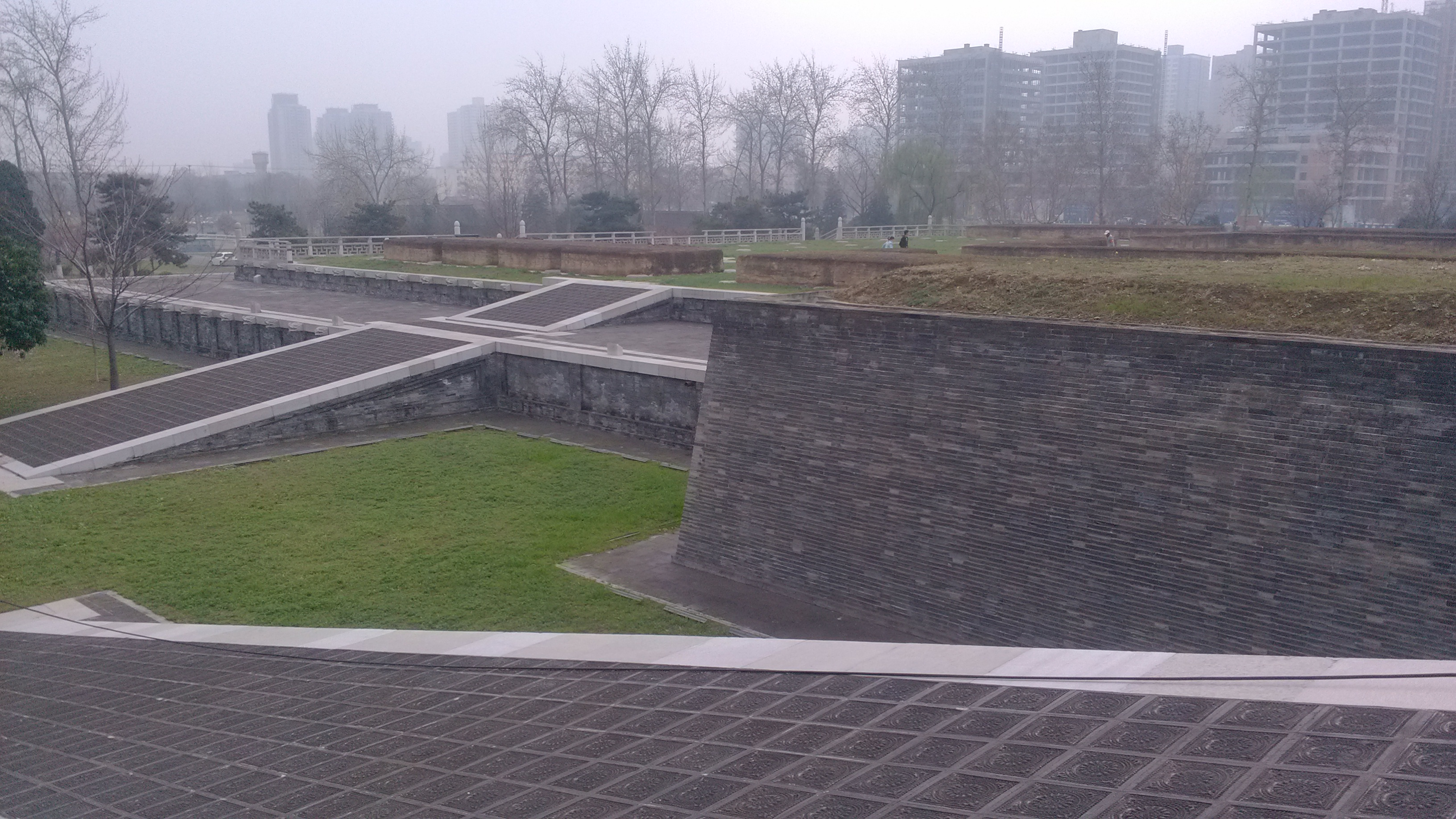
Linde Hall's platform

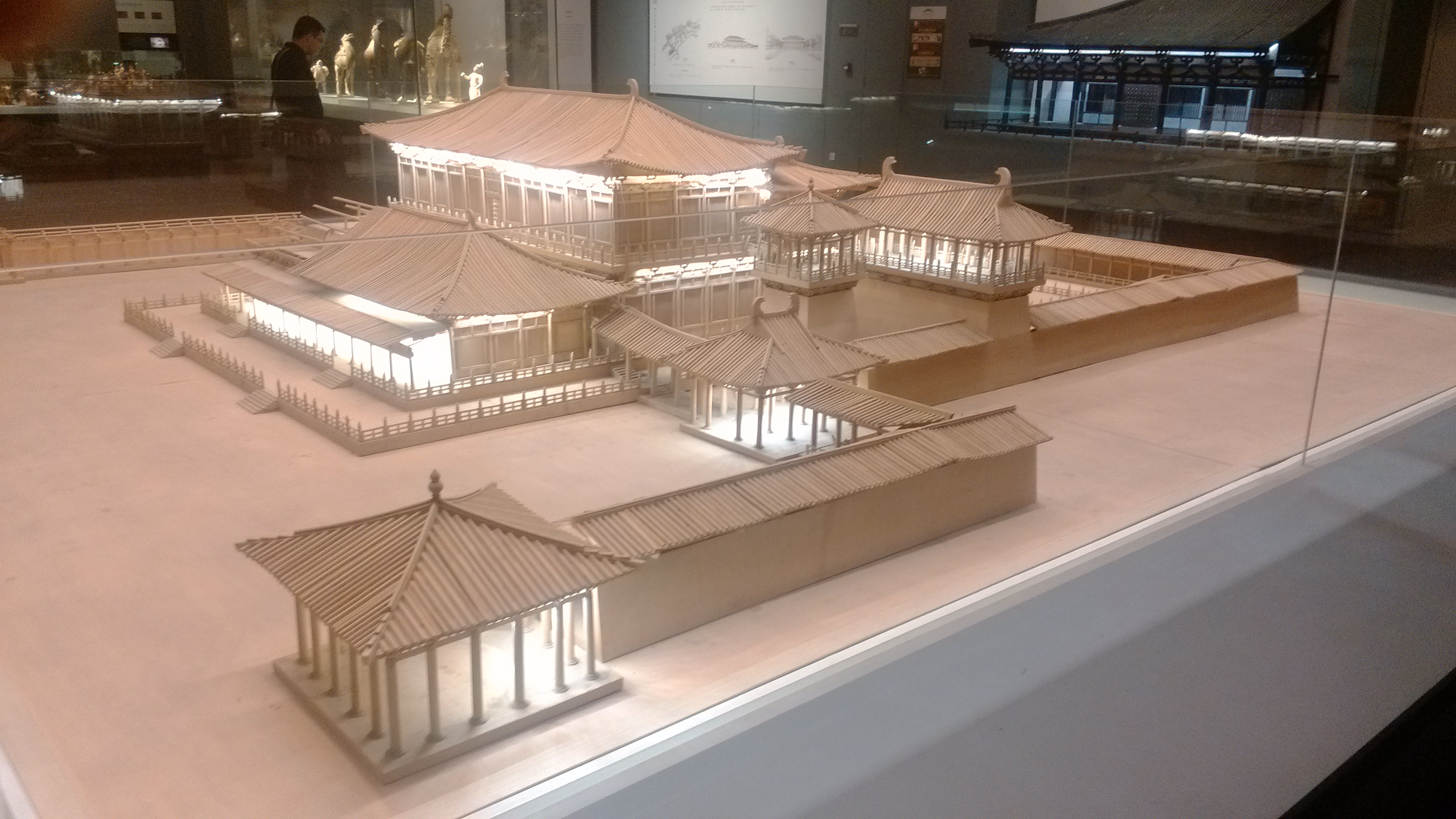

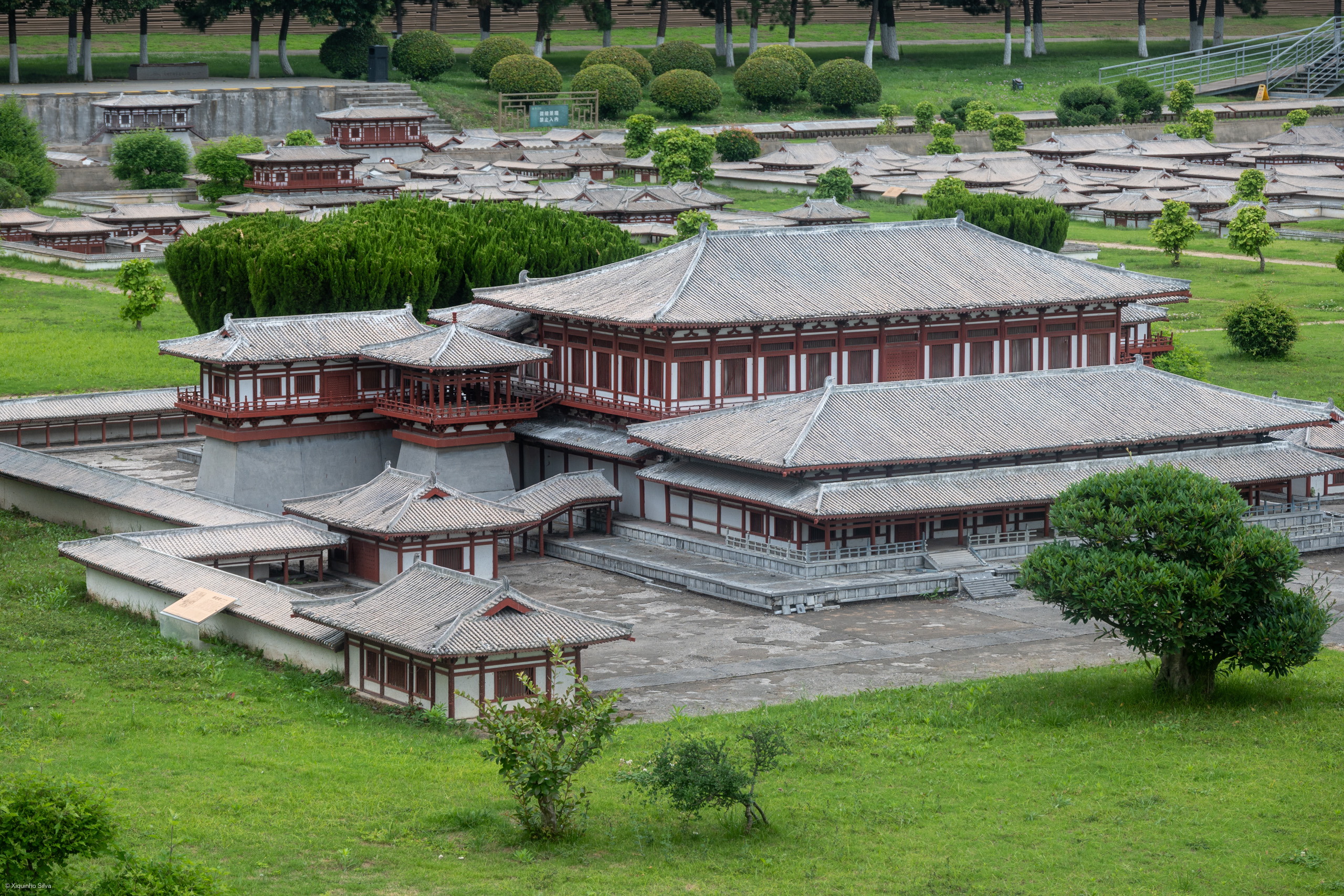
Model of the Linde Hall grounds

=== Border ===
The area around the palace complex grounds is currently planted with locust trees, willows, flowers, and bushes on all sides.

== Heritage ==
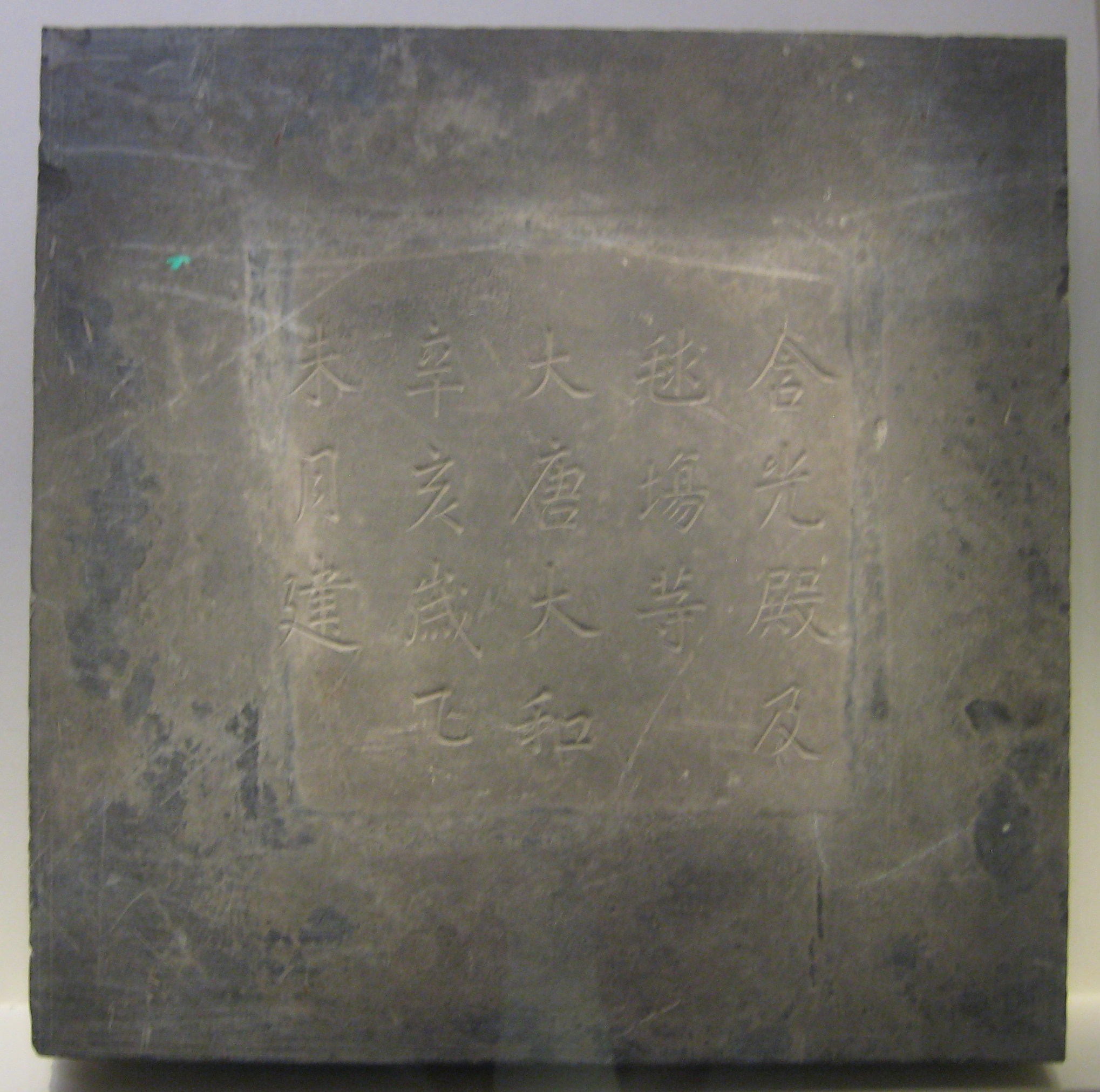
Stone inscription discovered in 1956 that commemorates the building of the Hanguang Hall (含光殿) and a polo field in the Daming Palace in 831

The site of the Daming Palace was discovered in 1957. Between 1959 and 1960, the earliest surveys and excavations of the Hanyuan Hall site were carried out by the Institute of Archaeology of the Chinese Academy of Sciences.

Preventive conservation measures of the Hanyuan Hall site began in 1993. From 1994 to 1996, for the restoration and preservation of the site, numerous surveys and excavations were conducted. The State Administration of Cultural Heritage (SACH) and UNESCO drew up and adopted a two-phased plan by 24 July 1995 to safeguard the Hanyuan Hall site. Work on the project started in 1995 by the joint effort of the Chinese government, Chinese and Japanese institutes, UNESCO, and various specialists. Most of the conservation work concluded in 2003.

On 1 October 2010, the Daming Palace National Heritage Park was opened to the public. There are many exhibition halls located throughout the site of the palace complex to showcase the excavated cultural relics of the site.

== Gallery ==
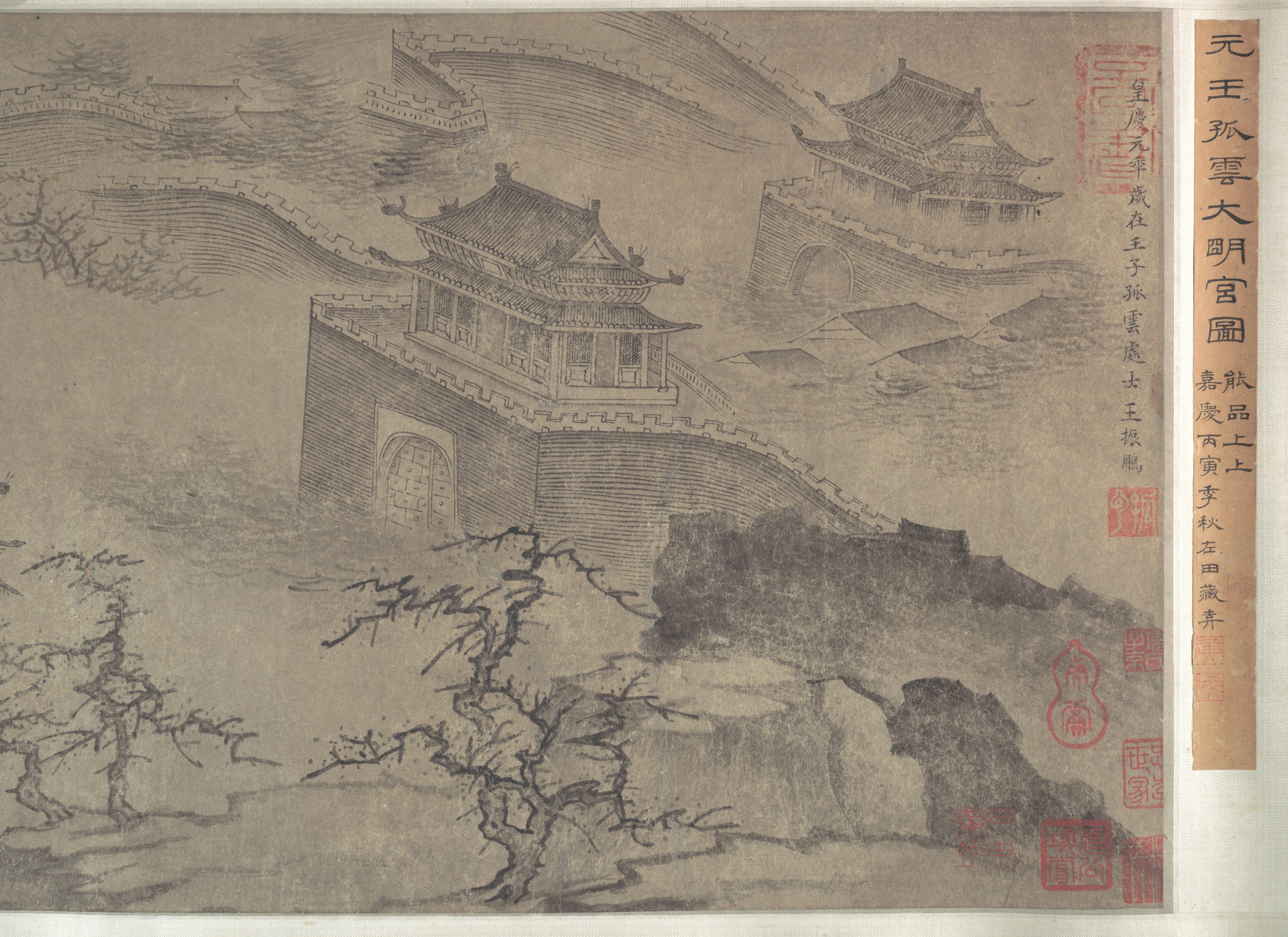
Daming Palace, attributed to Wang Zhenpeng (fl. 1275-1330) but likely 15th century production

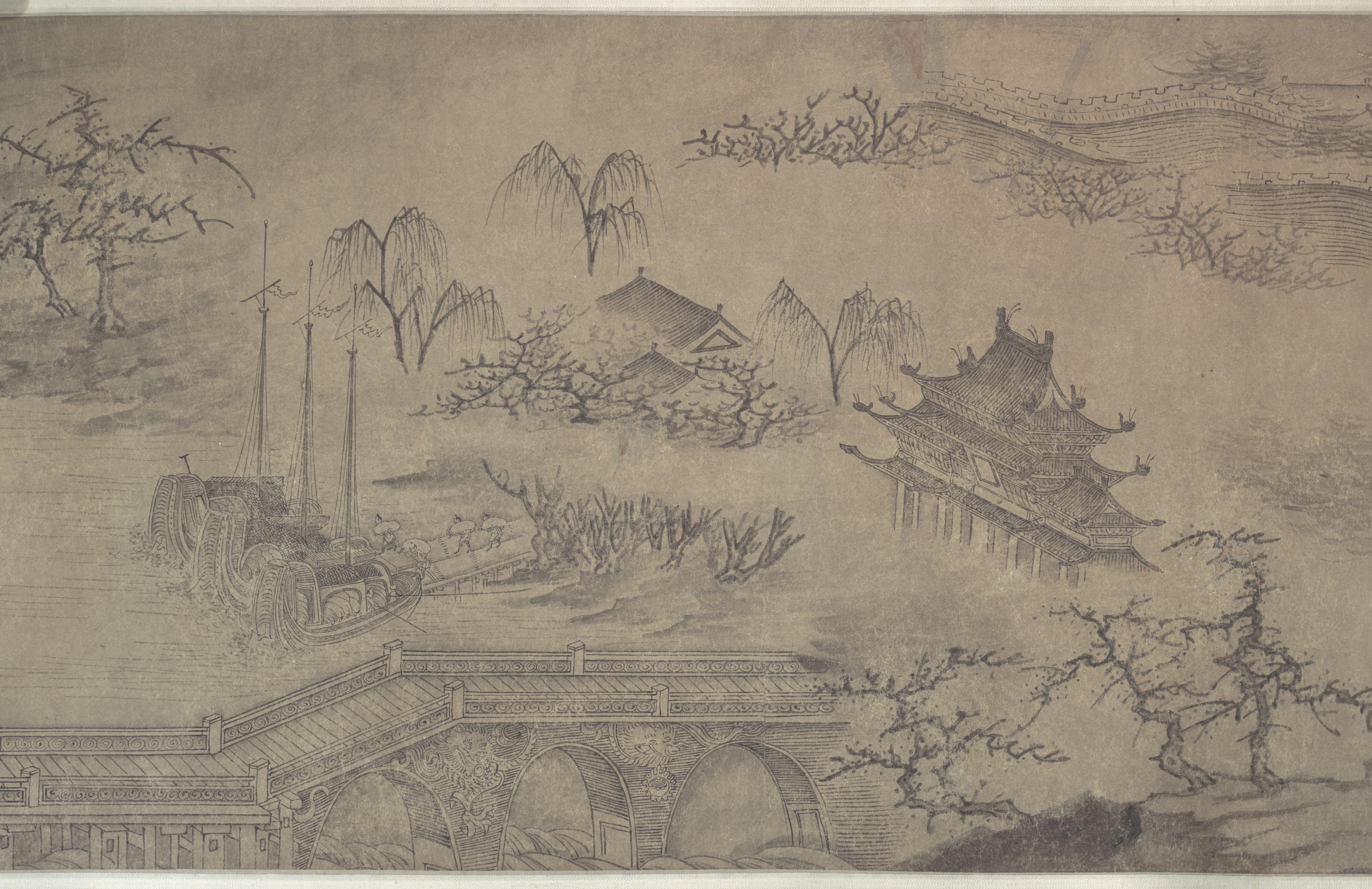

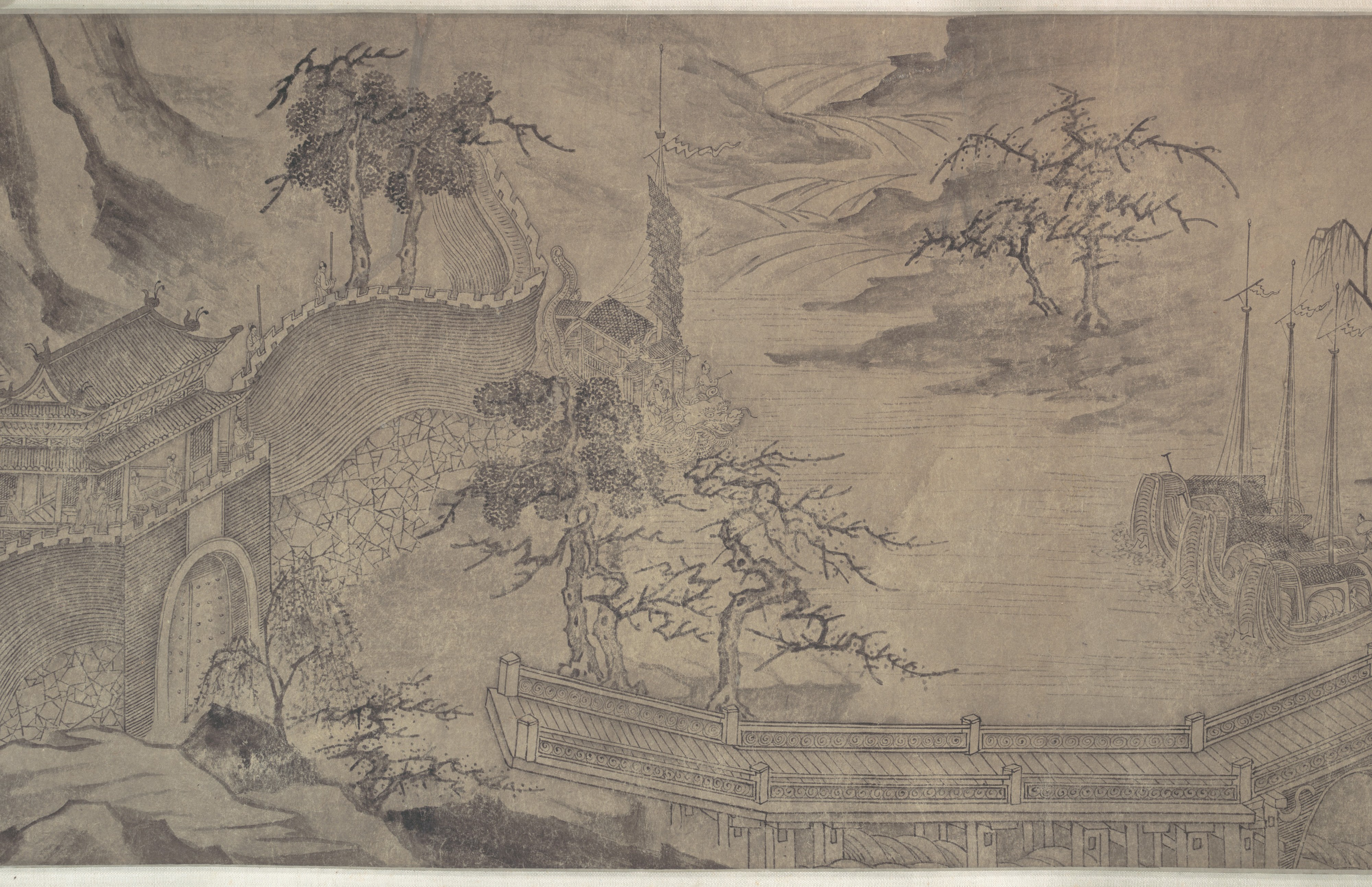

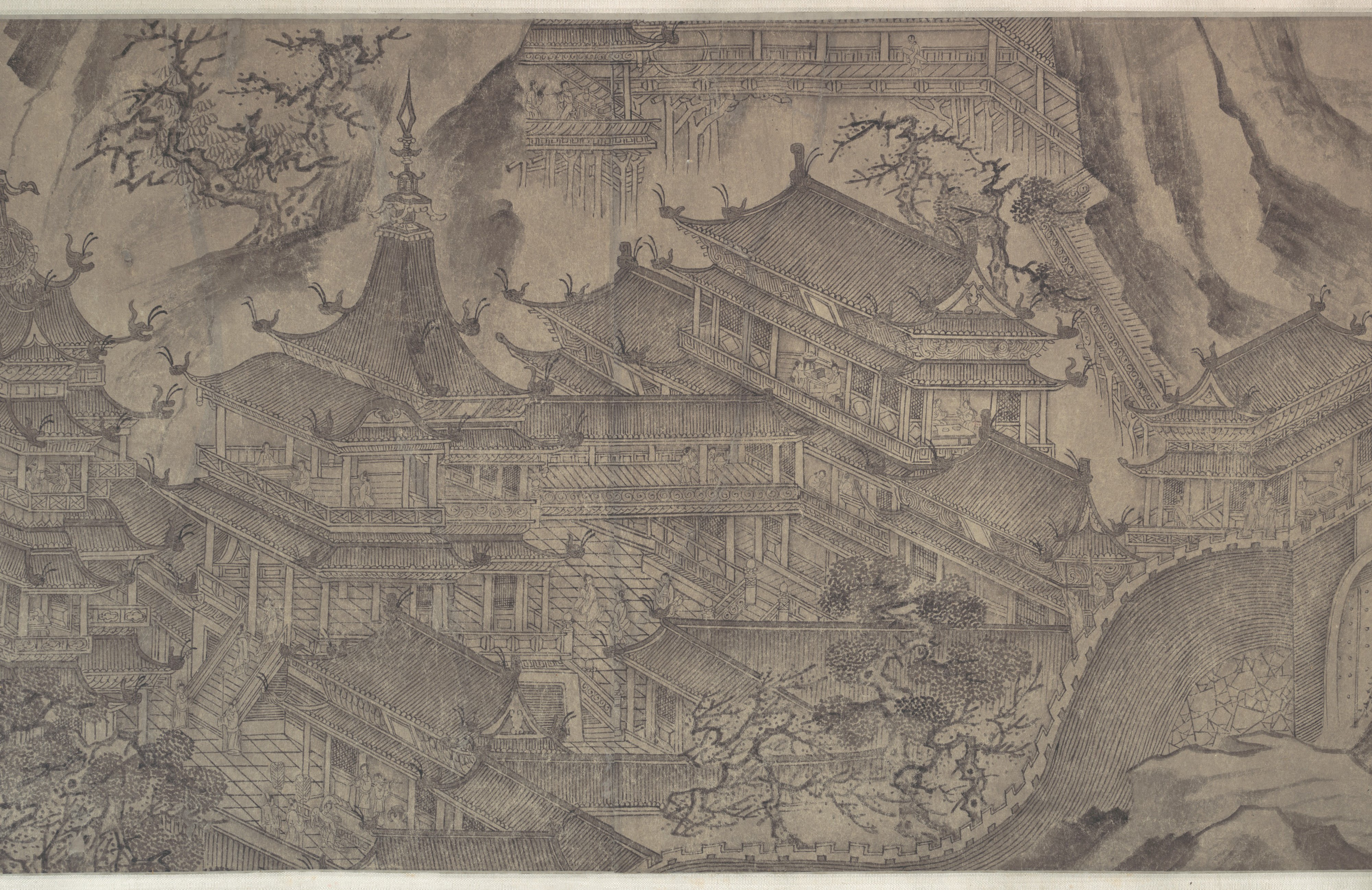

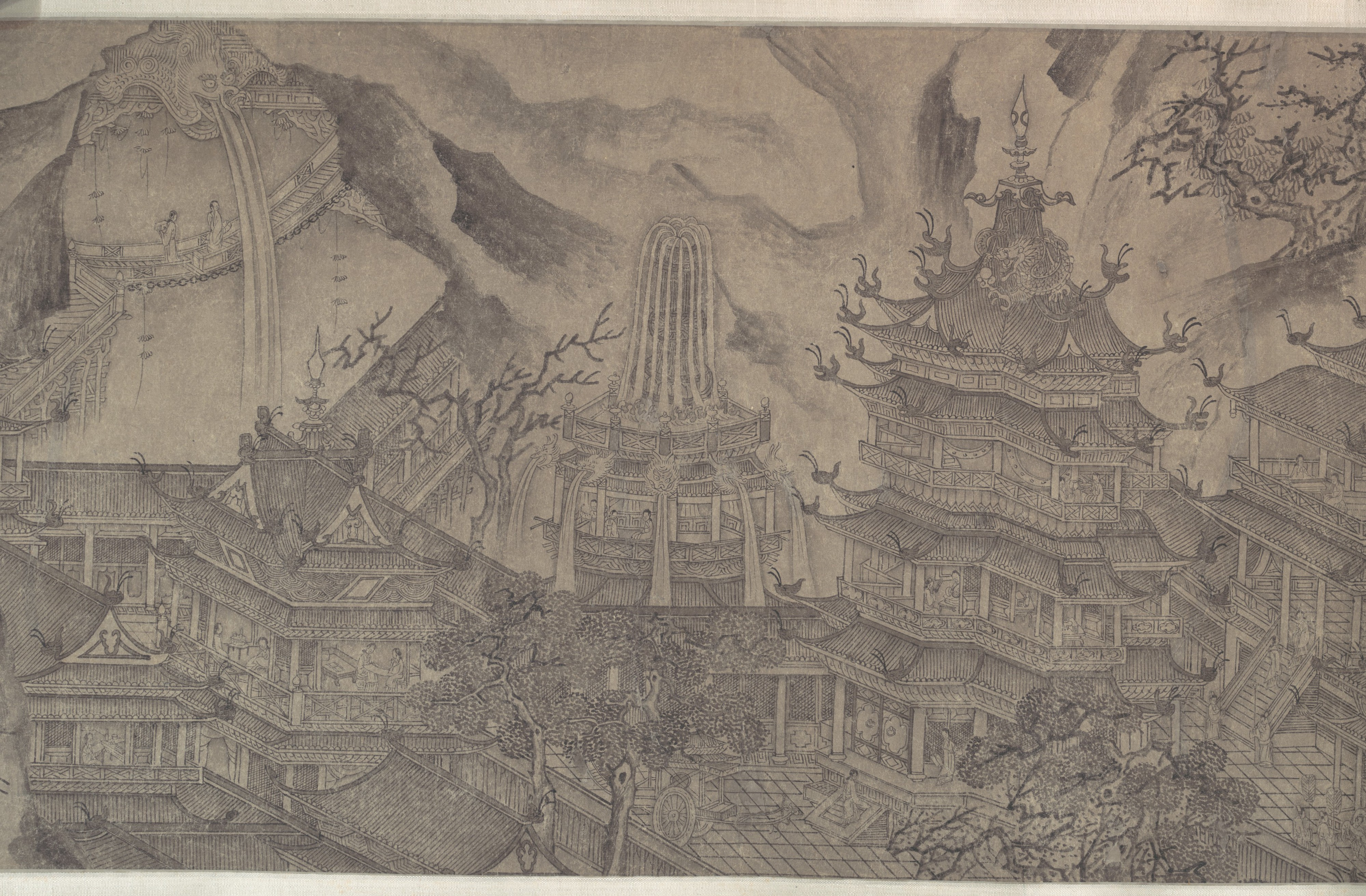

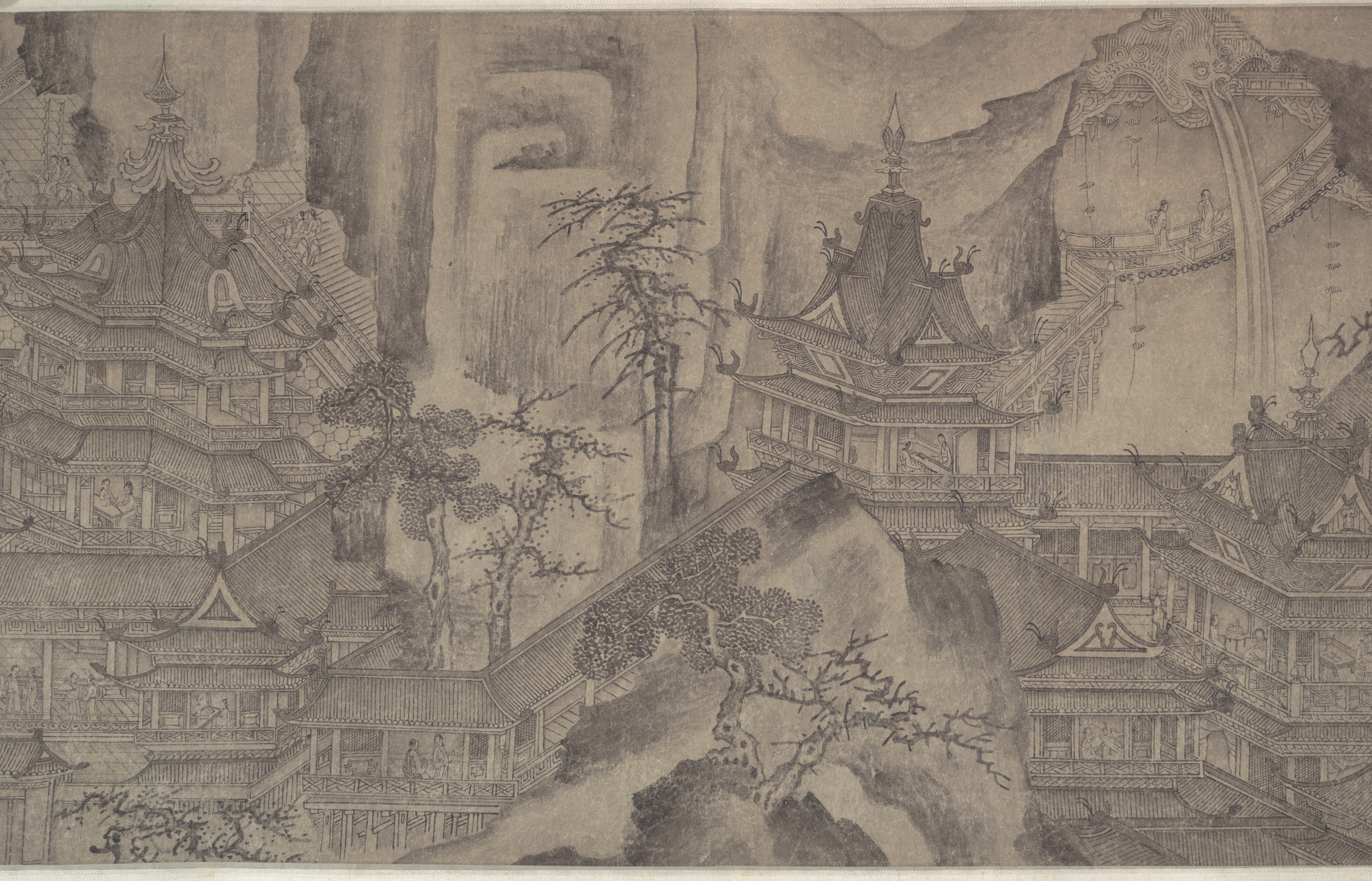

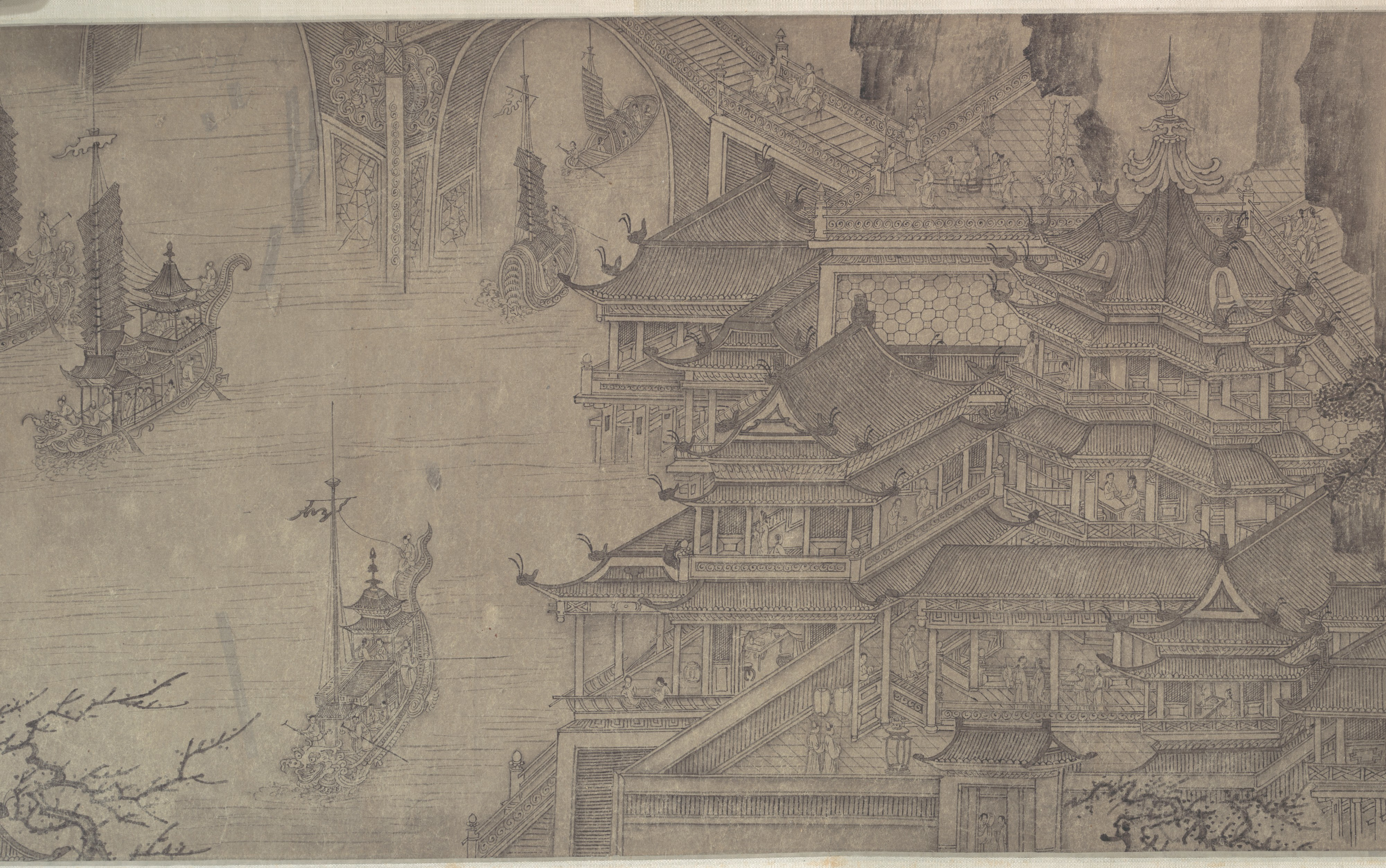

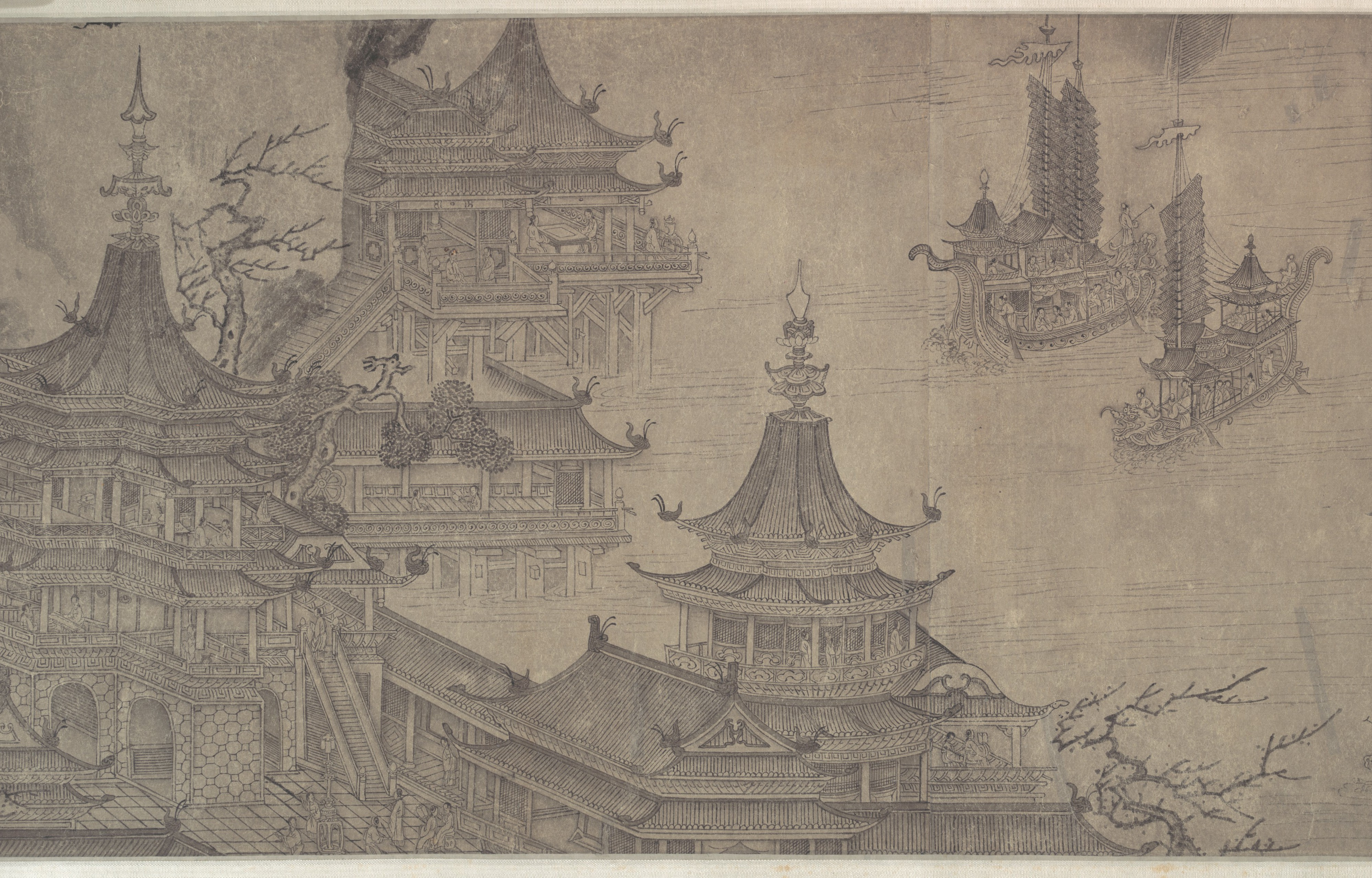

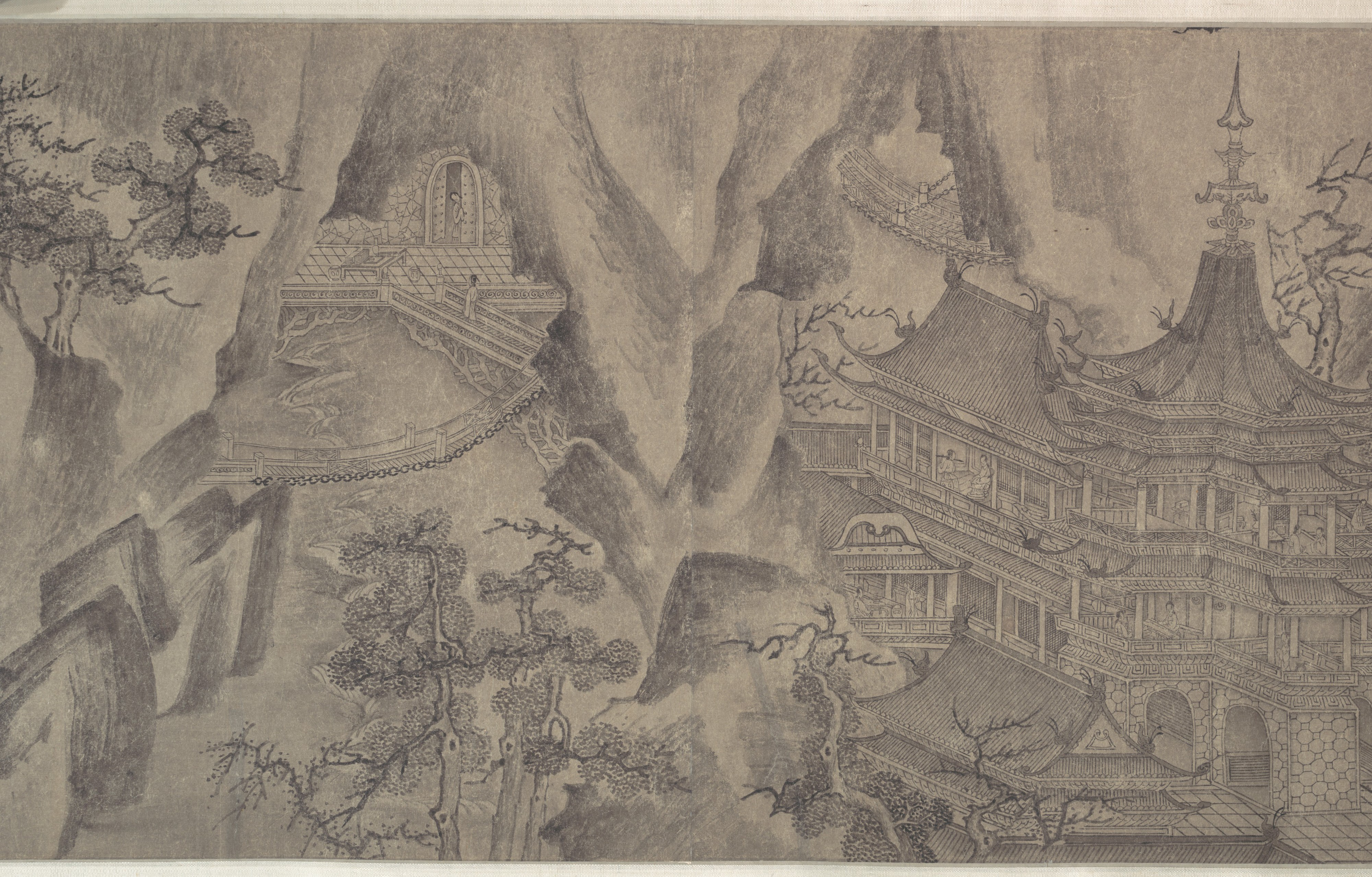

== See also ==
- Huang Chao Rebellion, which caused the destruction of the palatial complex
