= Chang He =

Tang dynasty general (586–653)

Chang He 常何
- Born: 586; Junyi County, Bian Prefecture, Sui China (Now Xiangfu District, Kaifeng, Henan)
- Died: June 16, 653 (aged 66–67)
- Other name: Dalai (大来)
- Occupations: General, official
- Children: At least 5

Chang He (586 – 16 June 653), Courtesy name Dalai, formally the Count of Wushui (武水伯), was a Tang dynasty general and official. He was the head of the Xuanwu Gate's guard during the Xuanwu Gate Incident, playing an important role in it.

== Background ==
Chang He was born in 586 during the reign of Emperor Wen of Sui. Chang Cen (常岑), his grandfather, served under Northern Qi, and Chang Xu (常续), his father, was a minor official. His ancestral home was in Wen County, Henei Commandery (now Wen County, Henan).

Initially serving under Li Mi, Chang He served under Wang Shichong before surrendering to the Tang dynasty. He followed Crown Prince Li Jiancheng in suppressing Liu Heita's rebellion and was also involved in defeating Xu Yuanlang. His position then was General of the Courageous Guard (驍騎將軍).

== Service Under Emperor Taizong ==
=== The Xuanwu Gate Incident ===
In 624, Li Shimin, the Prince of Qin, ordered Chang He to guard Xuanwu Gate (玄武門), the northern gate leading to the Palace City in imperial capital Chang'an. He bestowed Chang He and his subordinates gold for doing so. On 2 July, 626, Chang He allowed Crown Prince Li Jiancheng and his political ally Li Yuanji, the Prince of Qi, to enter Xuanwu Gate in order to answer Emperor Gaozu's summon while allowing Li Shimin to enter Xuanwu Gate with his troops beforehand to set up an ambush against them. After Li Jiancheng and Li Yuanji entered, Li Shimin and his troops ambushed and killed them in what would become known as the Xuanwu Gate Incident. Soon after this, Li Shimin forced Emperor Gaozu, his father, to make him the Crown Prince and, about two months later, forced him to abdicate in favor of him, who would become known as Emperor Taizong. Soon after the Xuanwu Gate Incident, Chang He was made the Baron of Wushui (武水男).

=== Discovery of Ma Zhou ===
By 631, Chang He was a General of the Household (中郎將).

In 631, Emperor Taizong ordered his officials to submit essays of suggestions. Chang He, being a martial man and not well-acquainted with writing, had Ma Zhou, his guest, to write for him. Ma Zhou wrote an essay of some 20 suggestions, which greatly impressed Emperor Taizong. When Emperor Taizong questioned Chang He about this essay, he said: "This is not what I can think of, but suggested by Ma Zhou, my guest. He is a loyal and filially pious man." Emperor Taizong summoned Ma Zhou and, after a smooth conversation, had him serve at the Menxia Sheng (門下省, Imperial Chancellary). He would eventually become a chancellor. Emperor Taizong awarded Chang He three hundred rolls of silk for discovering Ma Zhou.

=== Later life ===
Chang He's title was changed to Count of Wushui (武水伯) in 632.

In 637, Chang He was made the Inspector of Jing Prefecture.

In 642, Chang He was ordered to oversee renovations of the Palace of Nine Perfections.

In 645, Chang He served as the deputy of Zhang Liang in Emperor Taizong's campaign against Goguryeo, attacking Goguryeo by sea.

Chang He died on 16 June, 653, during the reign of Emperor Gaozong of Tang. His epitaph, written by Li Yifu, is mostly extant and found among the Dunhuang manuscripts. He was reburied in his hometown in 655.

== Notes and references ==
- New Book of Tang, vol. 82, 84, 220.
- Zizhi Tongjian, vol. 191.
- Zhenguan Zhengyao, vol. 2.
