= Daxing Palace =

6th-century palace in Xi'an, China

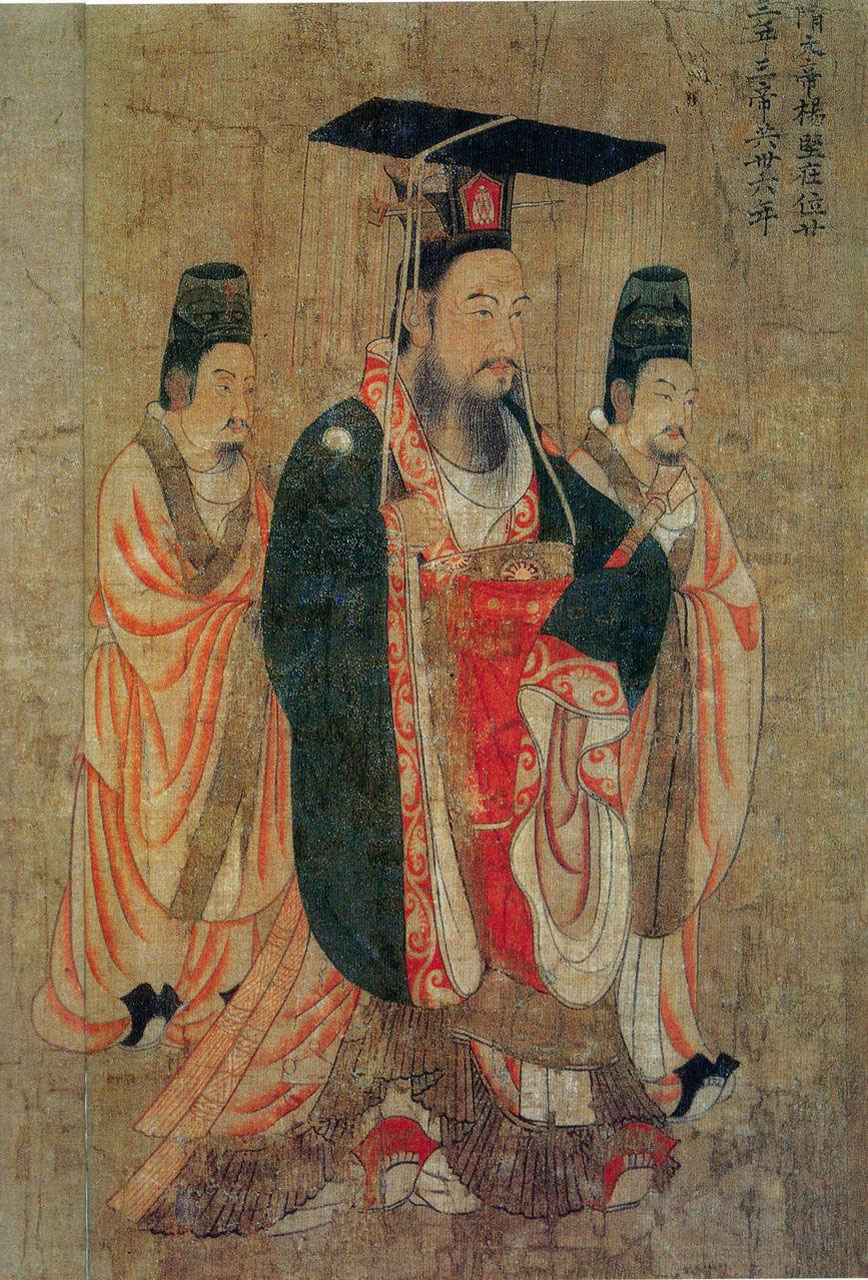
Painting of Emperor Wen of Sui

Daxing Palace (later known as the Taiji palace) was the palace of the Sui dynasty it was built under the order of Emperor Wen in 582. The palace was contained in the Imperial City of Daxing (Chang'an). The palace complex contained the Daxing (Taiji) palace (residence of the emperor), the East palace (seat of the crown Prince) and the Yeting palace on the west side (residence for the concubines of the emperor). The name was changed to "Taiji" during the Tang Dynasty. The palace was later incorporated into the larger Daming Palace complex.

A copy of the outline of the right hand of Yang Guifei was carved on a large stone at the site, and still exists.
