= Ma Zhou =

Chinese politician

Ma Zhou 馬周
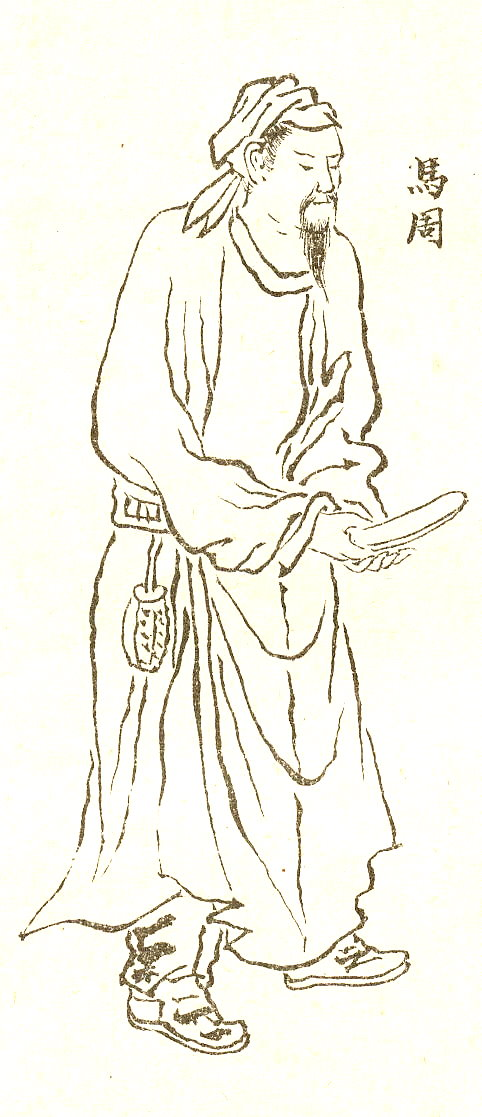
- Drawing of Ma by a Japanese painter
- Born: 601; Chiping County, Shandong
- Died: 648 (aged 46–47)
- Other names: Binwang (賓王)
- Occupation: Politician
- Children: Ma Zai; Ma Xun

Ma Zhou (601–648), courtesy name Binwang, formally the Duke of Gaotang (高唐公), was a Chinese politician who served as a chancellor during the reign of Emperor Taizong in the Tang dynasty. He was initially a commoner and a guest of the general Chang He, and after Chang submitted suggestions that Ma drafted, Emperor Taizong was impressed and retained Ma as an imperial official, eventually rising to the post of chancellor.

== Background and discovery by Emperor Taizong ==
Ma Zhou was born in 601, during the reign of Emperor Wen in the Sui dynasty. He appeared to have been born from a relatively poor household in Qinghe Commandery (清河, roughly modern Xingtai, Hebei) and lost his father early in life. He was studious, particularly concentrating on the Shi Jing and the Spring and Autumn Annals, but was also carefree, not paying attention to details, and because of this, the people of his home region did not view him highly. During the reign of Emperor Gaozu in the Tang dynasty, he served as a teacher in Bo Prefecture (博州, i.e., Qinghe), but was said to spend his days drinking, not concentrating on teaching the students, and was often rebuked by the prefect Daxi Shu (達奚恕). He thus resigned and went to travel in Cao Prefecture (曹州, roughly modern Heze, Shandong) and Bian Prefecture (汴州, roughly modern Kaifeng, Henan). While there, however, on one occasion he was insulted by Cui Xian (崔賢), the county magistrate for Junyi County (浚儀, in modern Kaifeng), and in anger, he travelled to the capital Chang'an. Once there, he became a guest of the general Chang He.

In 629, Emperor Gaozu's son and successor, Emperor Taizong, ordered his officials to submit suggestions for him. As Chang was unacquainted with historical writings, Ma drafted some 20 suggestions for him. When Emperor Taizong read the suggestions that Chang submitted, he was impressed, but he knew that Chang was not well-studied, he summoned Chang to ask him how he came up with the suggestions. Chang told Emperor Taizong that he did not write the suggestions and that Ma did. He also told Emperor Taizong that whenever he conversed with Ma, Ma was always concerned about faithfulness and filial piety. Emperor Taizong sent messengers to summon Ma into his presence, and once they conversed, he was impressed by Ma and, while initially not giving him an official position, had him serve at the examination bureau of the government (門下省, Menxia Sheng). In 632, he officially made Ma a governmental auditor. He awarded Chang silk for having discovered Ma.

== Service under Emperor Taizong ==
In 632, Ma Zhou submitted a petition to Emperor Taizong that was later included in its entirety in the Old Book of Tang for its importance, which made several suggestions to Emperor Taizong:

- That Emperor Taizong expand Da'an Palace (大安宮), the residence of Emperor Gaozu (who was then Taishang Huang (retired emperor)), to show filial piety.
- That Emperor Taizong should not spend much time away from Chang'an in the summer, because he would then be unable to attend to Emperor Gaozu.
- That Emperor Taizong's plans to create a feudal system of governance, where the contributors to his reign would be given inheritable prefectural posts to be passed to their descendants, were inadvisable, because there would be no guarantees in future generations that the descendants of capable men would also be capable.
- That Emperor Taizong should personally offer sacrifices to the imperial ancestors.
- That Emperor Taizong should be careful not to bestow honors on people not due them.

Emperor Taizong was impressed by Ma's suggestions and promoted him.

In 637, Ma submitted another petition considered important enough to be included in its entirety in the Old Book of Tang. He noted that at the time, even though Emperor Taizong had reigned for over a decade, the empire was still, overall, a fraction of the strength of the Sui dynasty at its prime, in terms of population and wealth. He pointed out that the population was therefore ill-equipped to deal with the construction projects that Emperor Taizong was then carrying out for his own palaces and for mansions for his sons and daughters. He advocated frugality, and further pointed out that Emperor Taizong's favors for his sons were creating competition between them, which was not good for the long term, either for his sons or for their descendants. Emperor Taizong praised Ma for his suggestions. Also based on Ma's suggestions, the institution of Chang'an city criers (who would call out at both dawn and dusk) and replaced with drums, greatly reducing the amount of labor necessary.

In 638, Ma was made a mid-level official at the legislative bureau (中書省, Zhongshu Sheng). Ma was praised for his alertness and logical thinking, and Emperor Taizong once stated, "If I did not see Ma Zhou for a while, I would always miss him." The chancellor Cen Wenben also stated, "When Mr. Ma analyzes matters, he took examples from both history and current events. He deletes what is not necessary, and then analyzes thoroughly. Nothing should be added and nothing should be taken away from what he writes. His words are well-written, and one will not get tired of them." In 641, Ma was given three different posts—assistant auditor, imperial advisor, and secretary to Emperor Taizong's son, Li Zhi (the Prince of Jin). After Li Zhi replaced his elder brother, Li Chengqian, as crown prince, Ma was made an advisor to the new crown prince as well as deputy head of the legislative bureau.

In 644, when Emperor Taizong, at an imperial gathering, stated to his key officials their strengths and weaknesses, he spoke, with regard to Ma:

Ma Zhou has quick reactions and is faithful and honest. When he evaluated others, he did so truthfully, and whatever task I give him, he usually performed it to my great satisfaction.

Later that year, Ma was made the acting head of the legislative bureau—a position considered one for a chancellor. In 645, when Emperor Taizong attacked Goguryeo, he left Li Zhi in charge of logistics at Ding Prefecture (定州, roughly modern Baoding, Hebei), assisted by Gao Shilian, Liu Ji, and Ma. Once Emperor Taizong returned from the Goguryeo campaign, he gave Ma the additional post as minister of civil service affairs.

Ma was said to suffer from chronic diabetes, and when Emperor Taizong built the Cuiwei Palace (翠微宮, in the Qinling Mountains), he looked for a place near the palace to construct a summer mansion for Ma. He also had the imperial physicians attend to Ma and often supplied Ma with imperial meals. As Ma's illness grew worse, Emperor Taizong personally attended to Ma's medicinal needs, while sending Li Zhi to greet him. As Ma grew gravely ill, he asked his family to bring him the copies of the petitions he had submitted to Emperor Taizong, and he personally burned them, stating, "Guan Zhong and Yan Ying [(晏嬰)] [both great chancellors of the Spring and Autumn period] publicly showed their lords' faults to become famous for posterity. That is something I will not do." He died in 648 and was buried near the tomb of Emperor Taizong's wife, Empress Zhangsun, where Emperor Taizong himself would eventually be buried. After Emperor Taizong died in 649 and Li Zhi succeeded him (as Emperor Gaozong), Ma was posthumously enfeoffed as the Duke of Gaotang. Later, after Emperor Gaozong's own death in 683, during the time when Emperor Gaozong's son Emperor Ruizong was emperor under the regency of his mother Empress Dowager Wu, Ma was worshipped at Emperor Gaozong's temple.

== Notes and references ==
- Old Book of Tang, vol. 74.
- New Book of Tang, vol. 98.
- Zizhi Tongjian, vols. 193, 194, 195, 197, 198.

.
