= Zhishi Sili =

7th-century Tang dynasty commander of Turkic origin

Zhishi Sili Duke Anguo
- Died: c. 663; Sichuan, Tang China
- Other name: Jing (景)
- Spouse: Princess Jiujiang (九江公主)
- Military career
- Allegiance: Eastern Turkic Khaganate (until 630); Tang dynasty (after 630)
- Conflicts: Emperor Taizong's campaign against Xueyantuo; Tibetan attack on Songzhou; Goguryeo–Tang War

Zhishi Sili (Chinese: 執失思力, romanized: Zhíshī Sīlì, d. c. 663) was Tang dynasty general of Turkic ethnicity and imperial son-in-law to Gaozu of Tang.

== Name ==
Friedrich Hirth reconstructed his surname Zhishi (執失) as *Čub Šad. Hayrettin İhsan Erkoç proposed several reconstructions like *Čibiš, *Čipši, *Čipšir and *Čipšit based on Middle Chinese reconstructions of the Chinese characters by various scholars.

== Background ==
Zhishi Sili was the chieftain of the Zhishi tribe in Eastern Turkic Qaghanate under Chuluo Qaghan and Illig Qaghan, holding the official position of elteber (Chinese: 俟利发, romanized: Sílìfā). His grandfather Zhishi Yan (执失淹), also an elteber, led several thousand cavalry sent by Shibi Qaghan to assist Tang forces in entering Chang'an when Li Yuan raised troops in Taiyuan. For his merit, he was appointed honorific titles Grand Master of Splendid Happiness with Golden Purple, Pillar of State. His father Zhishi Wu (执失武) was appointed honorific titles Senior General-in-Chief, Right Guard General, Pillar of State and Duke of Anguo. He accompanied Tang army against rebels like Dou Jiande and Gao Kaidao. He was also posthumously granted Auxiliary General title. Sili also had a brother called Zhishi Moheyou (执失莫诃友) who accompanied Tang Taizong in the Goguryeo–Tang War, was a Governor of Zhishi Prefecture and had honorific title Pillar of State.

== Biography ==
In August–September 626, he was sent by Illig Qaghan as an envoy to the Tang dynasty to observe their strengths and weaknesses. According to Chinese sources, he spoke disrespectfully, claiming that the Qaghan's million troops had already been deployed. Tang Taizong imprisoned him in the Menxia Bureau, but released him shortly after the Treaty of the Wei Bridge. However, Zhishi might have been an informant for Taizong. Zhenping Wang theorized that imprisonment was a clever way for Sili to defect to Tang.

In 630, he escorted the Empress Xiao of the Sui dynasty back to Tang territory. Taizong appointed him Left Leading Army General. After Illig Khan was defeated by the Tang, Taizong ordered Zhishi Sili to persuade the Hun and Hesa tribes to submit. According to Chinese sources, Zhishi Sili served in close attendance to Taizong often following him in hunts and remonstrating.

In 635 he participated in an attack against the Tuyuhuns. In autumn of 638, Songtsen Gampo personally commanded approximately 200,000 Tibetan troops in support of Tuyuhun and began attacking Songzhou (present-day Songpan County, Aba Tibetan and Qiang Autonomous Prefecture, Sichuan). However, at the same time, Songtsen Gampo also sent envoys to the Tang capital Chang'an to request a princess, claiming they intended to welcome the princess. Taizong dispatched Hou Junji commanding 50,000 troops, with Zhishi Sili appointed Commander-In-Chief of the Bailan Circuit, Niu Jinda, and Liu Jian assisting, to defendSongzhou. Meanwhile, Tibetan forces were besieging Songzhou's principal county — Jiacheng (also present-day Songpan, Sichuan), but the Tang vanguard forces under Niu Jinda's command defeated the Tibetan army.

In 645 CE, when Taizong campaigned against Goguryeo, Zhishi Sili was stationed on the Jinshan Route near Altai Mountains, commanding Turkic forces to check the Xueyantuo. When 100,000 Xueyantuo troops invaded Tang territory, Sili lured the Xueyantuo into Xiazhou and defeated them. In 646, he followed Li Daozong to destroy the Xueyantuo remnants, eliminating the Xueyantuo Khaganate. Sili later married Gaozu's daughter, Princess Jiujiang, as his wife, and was granted an iron charter, appointed as Consort Captain, and enfeoffed as Duke Anguo (Chinese: 安国公, lit. 'Duke for Pacifying the Country').

In 653, when Fang Yi'ai's rebellion occurred, Sili was implicated through his friendship with Yi'ai. Emperor Gaozong, considering Sili's military achievements, did not execute him but instead exiled him to Guizhou (not the modern province, but an area in what is now southern Sichuan). The Princess requested to have her fief reduced and accompany her husband. Princess Jiujiang died before Zhishi Sili. Sili served as Governor of Guizhou in 661–663 and died shortly thereafter. In 664, the Princess's fief was restored, Sili was posthumously granted the title Regional Commander of Shengzhou, with the posthumous name Jing (景).

== Family ==
Sili was married to Princess Jiujiang, daughter of Gaozu. His recorded children were:

- Zhishi Shaode (执失绍德)
- Zhishi Shaozong (执失绍宗)
- Zhishi Guiren (执失归仁)
- Zhishi Guizhen (执失归真)
- Zhishi Fengjie (执失奉节, 623 – 27 August 656) – Tang general
