= Tibetan invasion of Tuyuhun =

Tibetan invasion in 660s

Date	660–663
Location	modern-day Qinghai
Result	Tibetan victory; Destruction of Tuyuhun
Territorial changes	Incorporation of Tuyuhun into the Tibetan Empire

Belligerents
Tibetan Empire	Tuyuhun; Tang dynasty

Commanders and leaders
Mangsong Mangtsen	Murong Nuohebo; Cheng Jen-t'ai

In the 660s, the Tibetan Empire invaded and destroyed the Tuyuhun kingdom in the Lake Kokonor region (approximately Amdo in Tibetan and Qinghai in modern China). The war removed a vital buffer state between Tibet and the Tang dynasty, leading to direct conflict between the two.

== Background ==
By the mid 7th century, the Tibetan Empire had expanded significantly under the rule of Emperor Mangsong Mangtsen. Following the death of Songtsen Gampo in 650, power shifted to his chief minister, Mgar Sto rtsan, who strengthened Tibetan administration and legal structures. During this time, the Tuyuhun Kingdom, which had served as a buffer state between Tibet and China, came under increasing pressure from Tibetan expansion.

The Tuyuhun repeatedly sought help from the Tang court to resist Tibetan aggression. However, the Tang dynasty, busy fighting in Korea and with the Western Turks, could not lend much help. The Tibetans then launched their full-scale invasion of Tuyuhun in 660.

== Tibetan conquest of Tuyuhun ==
The Tibetans first attacked Tuyuhun in 660, and King Murong Nuohebo escaped north. The Tang court, under Emperor Gaozong, initially rejected the king's requests for aid.

In the summer of 663, the conflict between Tibet and the Tuyuhun Kingdom reached its climax. Both sides called for Chinese intervention and sent ambassadors to call on military action. In response, the Tang court named Cheng Jen-t'ai, the Governor-General of Liangzhou, as Commander-in-Chief of the Qinghai Expeditionary Army to assist the Tuyuhun. However, the defection of Tuyuhun minister Su Hegui to the Tibetans undermined Tuyuhun's defense. Then the Tibetan army made the final assault and the Tuyuhun army was disastrously defeated.

== Aftermath ==
As a consequence of the catastrophic defeat, the Tuyuhun king, his Chinese wife, and some thousands of families mainly the nobles and their retainers escaped to Liangzhou under Chinese protection. The Tang dynasty restructured its western defenses, redirecting military focus to the Gansu Corridor and the Tarim Basin.
