= Tuyuhun invasion of Gansu =

- Part of Emperor Taizong's campaign against Tuyuhun
| Date | 623 |
| Location | Gansu |
| Result | Tang victory |

Belligerents
| Tang dynasty | Tuyuhun |

Commanders and leaders
| Chai Shao | Unknown |

Casualties and losses
| Unknown | 500 killed |

The Tuyuhun invasion of Gansu took place between Tuyuhun and the Tang dynasty in 623. During the battle, the Tang general Chai Shao distracted the Tuyuhun soldiers with an erotic dance performed by two dancing girls. While the nomads watched the dance, Chai Shao attacked from the rear and defeated the Tuyuhun. The Tuyuhun suffered more than five hundred casualties over the course of the battle.

== Battle ==
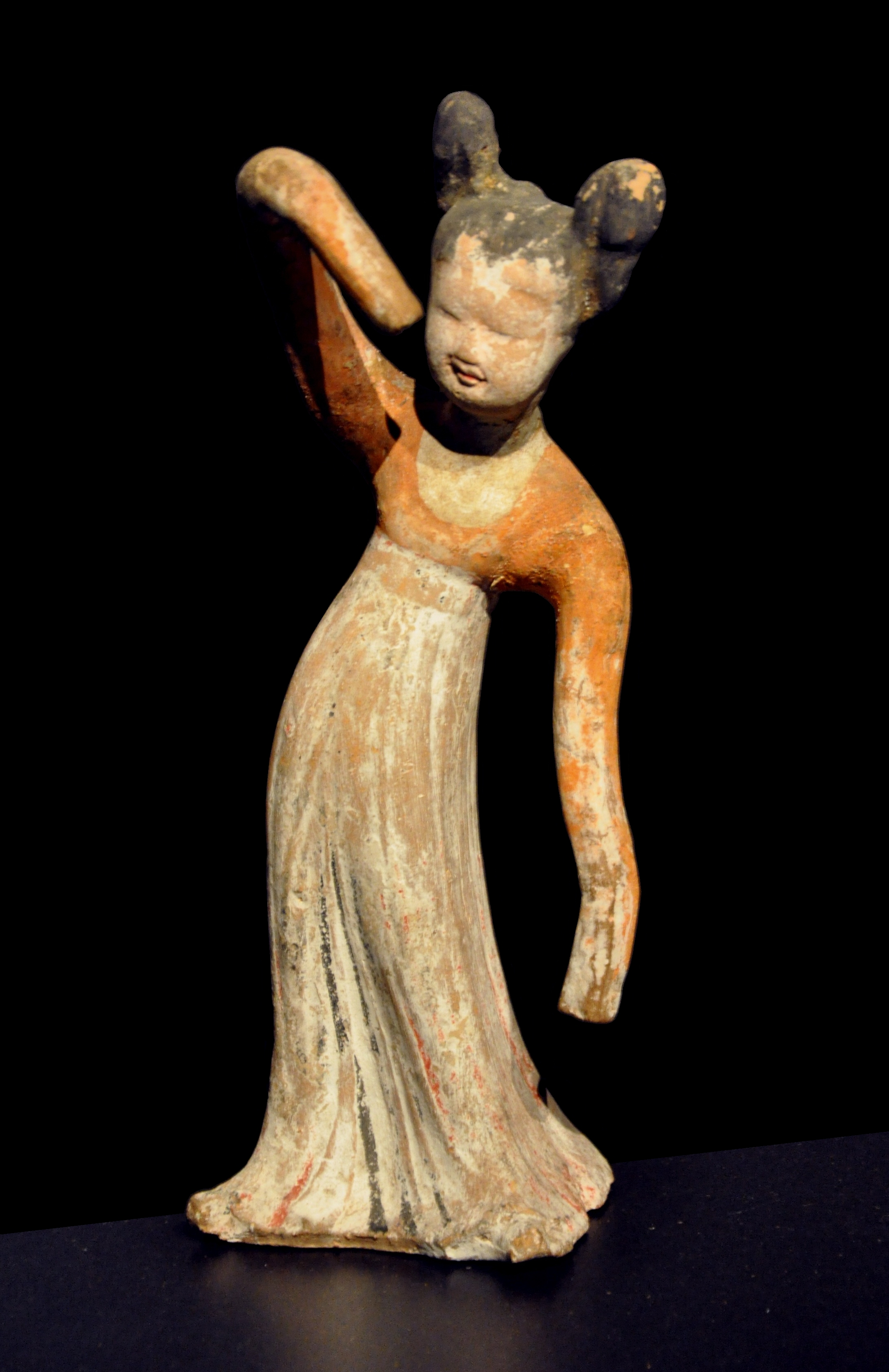
Clay figure of a dancing girl from the 8th century from the same era, the Tang dynasty.

The Tuyuhun and Tanguts regularly raided Tang settlements along the latter's western frontier. In 623, the Tuyuhun departed from their homeland in the pastures surrounding Qinghai Lake and invaded Gansu. The Tang general Chai Shao was dispatched to defeat the nomads and prevent further incursions. The Tuyuhun held the higher ground and shot arrows against the encroaching Tang forces.

Chai Shao, in the words of historian Charles Patrick Fitzgerald, "was a general of many, if unorthodox, resources." He devised a decoy by sending two dancing girls and a group of musicians to a small hill near the Tuyuhun camp. The musicians played the pipa, a stringed instrument of foreign origin, while the girls positioned themselves on top of a hill. On the hill, the dancing girls performed an erotic dance in front of the nomads. The attention of the Tuyuhun was diverted entirely towards the girls as the soldiers disbanded their military formation and rushed to the hill for a clearer view of the dance.

Seizing the opportunity, Chai Shao surprised the soldiers who were distracted by the performance, and attacked them in the rear with his cavalry. Over five hundred Tuyuhun soldiers were killed in the ensuing battle, forcing the Tuyuhun's retreat from Gansu. Fitzgerald ends his description of the Tuyuhun defeat with the moral that "it is most unwise, in the midst of battle, to let the mind dwell on the delights of peace."

== Aftermath ==
Hostilities between the Tuyuhun and Tang continued after the battle. Between 634 and 635, Emperor Taizong conducted a large military expedition against the Tuyuhun led by the general Li Jing. The Tang forces were reinforced with allied Tangut and Turkic soldiers during the invasion. Tuyuhun was defeated, and capitulated to the Tang court as a vassal.
