= Xia Prefecture =

Xia Prefecture may refer to:

- Xià Prefecture (夏州), a prefecture between the 5th and 13th centuries in modern Shaanxi and Inner Mongolia, China
- Xiá Prefecture (硤州 or 峽州), a prefecture between the 6th and 14th centuries in modern Hubei, China

== See also ==
- Xia (disambiguation)
