= Li Daliang =

Chinese military general and politician

Li Daliang (李大亮; 586–4 January 645) was a Chinese military general and politician during the early Tang dynasty, noted for his benevolence and virtue.

== During the Sui dynasty ==
Li Daliang was from Jingyang, close to Daxing, the Sui dynasty capital (which would become Chang'an, the Tang dynasty capital after 618). His great-grandfather Li Yan (李琰) had been a Minister of Revenue (度支尚書) during Northern Wei, and his father Li Chongjie (李充節) was a local commander-in-chief (總管) in the Sui dynasty. Li Daliang was talented in both the books and martial arts at an early age. In 617, he was serving under general Pang Yu (龐玉) near the eastern capital Luoyang, when he was defeated and captured by rebels under Li Mi. The other 100 plus captives were all executed, but Li Daliang was somehow spared by the rebel general Zhang Bi (張弼), who befriended him.

== Under Emperor Gaozu of Tang (Li Yuan) ==
In 618, Li Daliang joined Li Yuan (posthumously known as Emperor Gaozu) who founded the Tang dynasty. He was appointed county magistrate of Tumen (土門, roughly modern Fuping County, Shaanxi), which was then ravished by famine and bandits. Li Daliang sold his horses to aid the poor and needy, encouraged farming, and led his soldiers to eradicate bandits. When Li Yuan's son Li Shimin passed through the area, he was very impressed with what he saw and heard, so he rewarded Li Daliang with horses and fabrics. Once, knowing that he couldn't resist an incursion by a large Göktürks force numbering more than 1,000 men, Li Daliang went to the enemy camp by himself on a horse. He spoke at length about the risks and rewards, and persuaded the Göktürks to submit. He slaughtered his horse, feasted with the tribesmen, and returned to Tumen on foot. The Tang emperor was very pleased by his accomplishment, and promoted Li Daliang to Adjutant of Area Command (總管府司馬) in Jin Prefecture.

In 620, Li Daliang participated in the campaign against warlord Wang Shichong, leading an army towards Xiangyang defended by Wang Shichong's nephew Wang Honglie (王弘烈). He captured over 10 cities, and killed Wang Shichong's general Guo Da'an (國大安). For his success, Li Yuan appointed him governor of An Prefecture.

In 623, Li Daliang was named Pacification Commissioner (安撫使) and sent with an army to Guǎng Prefecture to pacify the area. On his way, he was in Jiujiang when Fu Gongshi rebelled against Tang. Li Daliang immediately led his men towards Hong Prefecture, defended by Fu Gongshi's general Zhang Shan'an (張善安). With their armies on opposite sides of the Gan River, Li Daliang talked to Zhang Shan'an and tried to induce him to surrender. Zhang Shan'an said he was pressured by his soldiers into rebelling, and he wasn't sure whether he would be punished if he surrendered. Li Daliang said, "Commander-in-Chief Zhang, if you plan to surrender, then we are family." He alone crossed the river on his horse, took Zhang Shan'an's hands and gained his trust. Zhang Shan'an agreed to surrender, and went to Li Daliang's camp with more than 10 cavalrymen. Li Daliang asked the cavalrymen to stay outside while he led Zhang Shan'an inside. After chatting for a while, Li Daliang ordered his soldiers to detain Zhang Shan'an, as the cavalrymen outside fled.

After a while, Zhang Shan'an's soldiers arrived and demanded Li Daliang return their general. Li Daliang had someone tell them that Zhang Shan'an didn't want to return because he was serious about surrendering. Zhang Shan'an's soldiers thought they were betrayed and deserted, so they all scattered. Li Daliang led his men to capture many of them. Zhang Shan'an was delivered to Chang'an (and eventually killed). In February 624, Li Daliang led his soldiers to You Prefecture (猷州; around modern Xuancheng), where Fu Gongshi had laid a siege. He defeated Fu Gongshi to save You Prefecture. After Fu Gongshi was killed soon after, the emperor rewarded Li Daliang with hundreds of maidservants, but Li Daliang set them all free, saying:

Most of you are from good families, and reduced to this only because of war and misfortune. How do I have the heart to treat you as lowly slaves!

When Li Yuan heard of this, he gasped in admiration, but resent him another 20 girls. Afterwards Li Daling served as Commander-in-Chief (都督) of Yue Prefecture.

== Under Emperor Taizong of Tang (Li Shimin) ==
Li Shimin (posthumously known as Emperor Taizong) became the Tang emperor in 626. The following year Li Daliang was assigned to Jiaozhou. When he left his post in Yue Prefecture, he left behind hundreds of volumes of his writing as he felt they would help his successors. Later he returned to the capital to serve as Chief Minister of the Court of the Imperial Treasury (太府卿), before being sent out to Liang Prefecture in the western parts of the empire as Commander-in-Chief. In 629, an emperor's messenger arrived and noticed a magnificent eagle in Li's possession. To ingratiate himself to Li, he advised Li to present it to the emperor as a gift. Li Daliang then secretly wrote a letter to the emperor, which said:

You banned hunting a long time ago, but your messenger is looking for an eagle. If this is your idea, you are violating your own edict; if this is his idea, you are using the wrong person.

The emperor praised Li Daguang's loyalty and honesty, and wrote this reply: "What is there for me to worry about if I have ministers like you!" He also endowed Li Daliang with a foreign vase in his personal possession, as well as the historical text Annals of Han (漢紀) written by Xun Yue in the Han dynasty.

In 630, Illig Qaghan was captured as the Göktürk tribesmen scattered in the Yiwu region (around modern Hami City, Xinjiang). Li Shimin appointed Li Daliang Pacification Commissioner of the Xibei Circuit (西北道) to induce the surrenders of the Turkic chieftains. Li Shimin had wanted to win over chieftains by providing them with food, cloth and titles, with the plan of resettling them south of the Yellow River. Li Daliang opposed the idea, and wrote a memorial in which he said,

Pacifying domestic people should take priority over winning over foreign people. China is akin to a tree trunk, with the Four Barbarians being branches and leaves. Giving resources in China to the Four Barbarians is like uprooting a tree and thinking it would benefit the branches and leaves.

Li Shimin listened to his advice and left the Göktürks outside of Tang's border.

In 634, Li Daliang was sent to Jiannan Circuit as an Inspection Commissioner (巡省大使). He attacked corruption and promoted good government, earning the approval of the common people.

Later that year, Li Shimin decided to carry out a major campaign against the hostile western neighbor Tuyuhun. Li Daliang was appointed Commander-in-Chief of the Hedong Circuit under general Li Jing. The force led by Li Jing, Li Daliang, and general Xue Wanjun (薛萬均) which headed northwest defeated the Tuyuhun main army the following year, as Li Daliang captured more than 20 nobles and more than 50,000 livestock animals in a battle near Mount Shuhun (蜀渾山; probably around modern Gonghe County, Qinghai). The Tuyuhun khan Murong Fuyun fled (and was killed in flight), and his son Murong Shun surrendered. Li Shimin created Murong Shun a khan to succeed his father and pulled the main Tang army out of Tuyuhun, but Li Daliang with a few thousand men were temporarily left behind to support Murong Shun—who was unpopular with his people—until Murong Shun's assassination a few months after. For his merits in this campaign, Li Daliang received a sumptuous gift including 150 maidservants from the emperor, but he gave everything to his relatives.

At some point Li Daliang was appointed General-in-Chief of the Right Guard (右衛大將軍) in the capital Chang'an. In winter 641, the Göktürks under Qilibi Khan (a vassal of the Tang resettled in the Ordos Loop) were attacked by Xueyantuo people under Zhenzhu Khan, and Li Shimin sent Li Daliang and other generals to aid Qilibi Khan, with Li Shiji in overall command. A few months later, the Tang army dealt a major blow to the Xueyantuo troops, which fled back to their territory.

In May 643, Li Shimin created his son Li Zhi his crown prince, and Li Daliang was appointed Right Defense Guard Commander for the Crown Prince (太子右衛率) while retaining his post with the Imperial Guards. In September 643, Li Daliang was also appointed Minister of Works (工部尚書). With three concurrent appointments, Li Daliang worked even harder to guard both the emperor's and the crown prince's palaces, often sleeping upright for entire nights when his soldiers were on duty. Li Shimin would say: “When you, sir, are on duty, I can sleep soundly through the night.” Fang Xuanling, the grand councilor, also praised Li Daliang greatly, even comparing him to the virtuous Han dynasty ministers Wang Ling (王陵) and Zhou Bo.

It was around this time Li Daliang reencountered Zhang Bi, the general who spared his life in the Sui dynasty, by chance on the street. With tears in his eyes, he held Zhang Bi's hands and humbly offered him all his money. Zhang Bi refused. Li Daliang then told the emperor how indebted he was to Zhang Bi, and the emperor promoted Zhang Bi from a Palace Construction Aide (將作丞) to Commander-in-Chief of Dai Prefecture as a result. Li Daliang was praised for remembering and repaying the kindness he had received.

In November 644, as Li Shimin prepared to lead an army against Goguryeo, he went to Luoyang and appointed Li Daliang vice-governor of the capital Chang'an, under governor Fang Xuanling who had spoken highly of him. But soon Li Daming fell ill. When Li Shimin heard of it, he personally prepared medicine and ordered it delivered to him by the relay system, but Li Daliang's symptoms did not improve. On his deathbed, Li Daliang wrote a petition to the emperor, advising him to abandon the campaign against Goguryeo and instead focus on properly managing the Chang'an area. (The first campaign in the Goguryeo–Tang War in 645 turned out to be a failure.)

When news of his death reached Li Shimin, the emperor broke down and cried. Imperial sessions were suspended for three days, and Li Daliang received the posthumous name "Yi" (懿; meaning "virtuous") as well as many posthumous titles. Li Daliang had lived simply so that when he died there was no jade or pearl at home to put in his coffin as was the tradition. Instead, he was buried with only rice and cloth. In fact, Li Daliang had spent a lot of money giving proper burials to relatives without offspring. He had also helped raise so many orphans, that 15 people not his own children mourned him like their father during the funeral. Li Daliang was buried in Zhao Mausoleum, where Li Shimin would later also be buried.

== Notes and references ==
- Liu Xu; et al. (945). Jiu Tang Shu (舊唐書) [Old Book of Tang] (in Chinese).
- Ouyang Xiu; et al. (1060). Xin Tang Shu (新唐書) [New Book of Tang] (in Chinese).
- Sima Guang (1086). Zizhi Tongjian (資治通鑑) [Comprehensive Mirror for Aid in Government] (in Chinese).
