= Hou Junji =

Chinese Tang dynasty general and official (died 643)

Hou Junji 侯君集
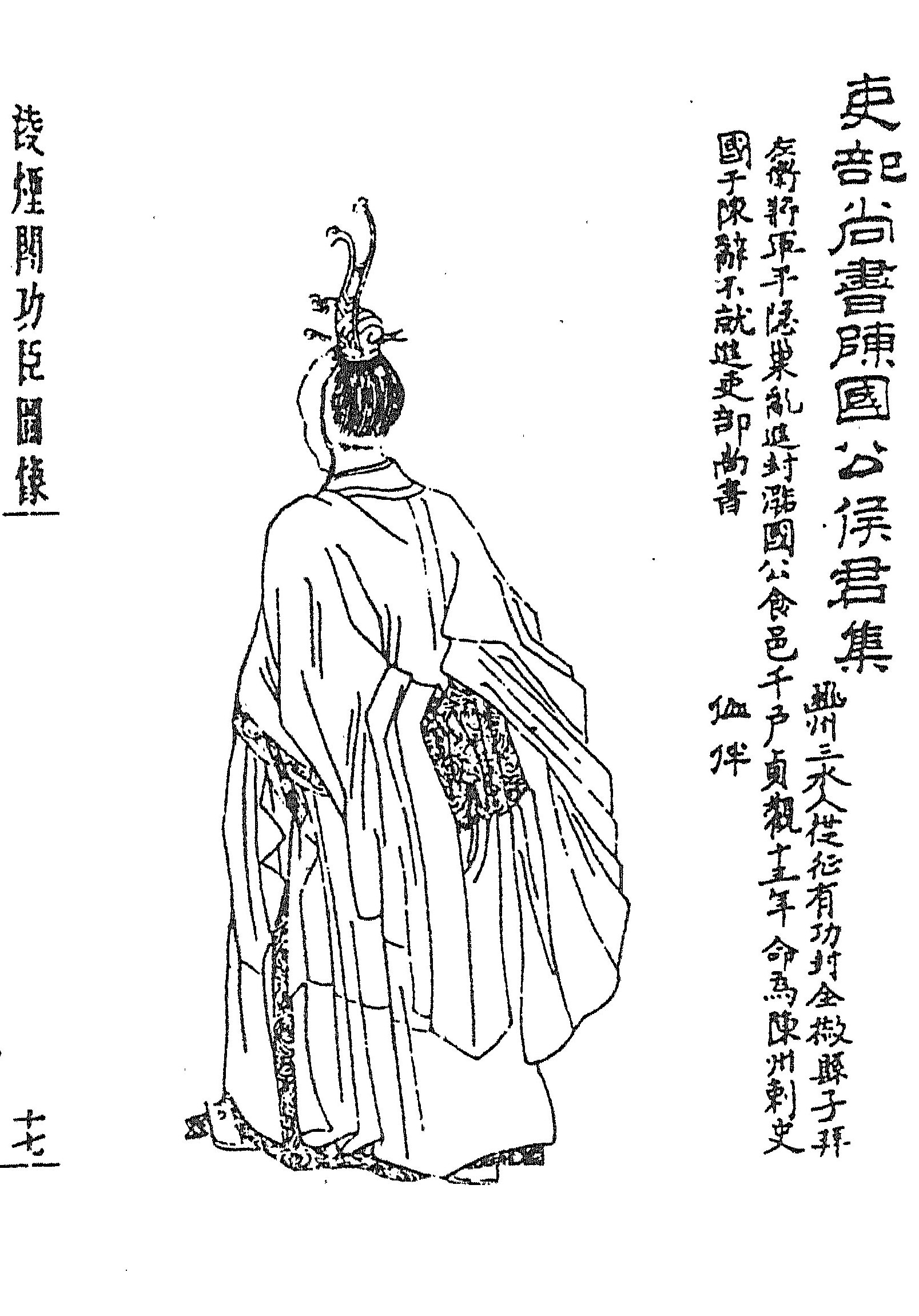
- Born: Unknown; Xunyi County, Shaanxi
- Died: April 29, 643; Xi'an, Shaanxi
- Occupations: General, statesman
- Father: Hou Ding

Hou Junji (died April 29, 643), noble title Duke of Chen (陳國公), was a Chinese general and official who served as a chancellor during the reign of Emperor Taizong in the Tang dynasty. He is best known for leading the Tang military campaigns against the Gaochang and Tuyuhun kingdoms. In 643, he was implicated in a plot by the crown prince, Li Chengqian, to overthrow Emperor Taizong, and was executed.

== During Emperor Gaozu's reign ==
Hou Junji's date of birth is unknown. Little is known about his family background other than that he was from Bin Prefecture (豳州, roughly modern Xianyang, Shaanxi). It was said that he was pretentious and always wanted to appear impressive. He favored using the bow and arrow; while he never achieved greatness in archery, he became known for his fighting abilities. At a point early in the reign of Emperor Gaozu, who was then still trying to reunify China after the collapse of the Sui dynasty, Hou came to serve under Emperor Gaozu's son, the major general Li Shimin the Prince of Qin. While serving under Li Shimin, for his accomplishments, Hou was created the Viscount of Quanjiao. He also became a close associate of Li Shimin, often offering Li his strategies.

By 626, Li Shimin was locked in an intense rivalry with his older brother Li Jiancheng, who was the Crown Prince. He feared that Li Jiancheng would kill him. Hou, along with Li Shimin's brother-in-law Zhangsun Wuji, Zhangsun's uncle Gao Shilian, and the general Yuchi Gong, advised Li Shimin to act first and ambush Li Jiancheng and another brother who supported Li Jiancheng, Li Yuanji the Prince of Qi. Li Shimin agreed, and in 626 ambushed Li Jiancheng and Li Yuanji, killing them. During the subsequent battles between Li Shimin's forces and Li Jiancheng's and Li Yuanji's forces, Hou led Li Shimin's forces. Following these battles, Li Shimin effectively forced Emperor Gaozu to make him the crown prince, and then to yield the throne to him (as Emperor Taizong).

== During Emperor Taizong's reign ==
Late In 626, when Emperor Taizong personally ranked the contributions of the generals and officials in order to grant them fiefs, Emperor Taizong ranked five of them—Hou Junji, Zhangsun Wuji, Fang Xuanling, Du Ruhui, and Yuchi Gong to be contributors of the highest grade, and Hou was created the Duke of Lu.

In 630, Emperor Taizong made Hou the minister of defense and gave him the additional designation of Canyi Chaozheng (參議朝政), making him a de facto chancellor.

In 634, Emperor Taizong, sending the senior general Li Jing to command the campaign against Tuyuhun's Busabo Khan Murong Fuyun, made Hou and Li Daozong the Prince of Rencheng Li Jing's assistants on the campaign. By spring 635, Tang forces achieved initial victories, but Tuyuhun forces then burned the grazing grass to cut the food supplies to Tang horses. Most Tang generals wanted to withdraw, but Hou advocated continued advance, and Li Jing agreed, eventually allowing complete victory, as Murong Fuyun was killed by his subordinates, allowing his son Murong Shun, whom Tang supported, to become khan (as Yidou Khan). Around the new year 636, after Murong Shun was assassinated by his subordinates, Emperor Taizong sent Hou with an army to try to secure the throne for Murong Shun's son Murong Nuohebo.

In 637, as part of Emperor Taizong's scheme to bestow prefectures on his relatives and great generals and officials as their permanent domains, Hou's title was changed to Duke of Chen, and he was given the post of prefect of Chen Prefecture (陳州, roughly modern Zhoukou, Henan), to be inherited by his heirs. Soon, however, with many objections to the system, the strongest of which came from Zhangsun Wuji, Emperor Taizong cancelled the scheme, although Hou's title remained Duke of Chen.

In 638, Tufan's Songtsen Gampo, after hearing that the rulers of Tujue and Tuyuhun were all able to marry Tang princesses, requested to marry one as well, but was rebuffed by Emperor Taizong. In anger, he launched a major attack on Tang, capturing a number of prefectures. Emperor Taizong sent Hou to counterattack, assisted by other generals Zhishi Sili (執失思力), Niu Jinda (牛進達), and Liu Jian (劉簡). Niu was subsequently able to defeat Tufan forces at Song Prefecture (松州, roughly modern Ngawa Tibetan and Qiang Autonomous Prefecture, Sichuan), and Songtsen Gampo, in fear, withdrew, but still requested to marry a Tang princess. (This time, Emperor Taizong agreed, sending Princess Wencheng, a daughter of a clansman, to marry Songtsen Gampo.)

Around the new year of 640, Qu Wentai (麴文泰), the king of Gaochang, formed an alliance with Western Tujues who are hostile to Tang. Emperor Taizong sent Hou, assisted by Xue Wanjun (薛萬均), to attack Gaochang. When Hou arrived at Gaochang, Qu Wentai died of distress and was succeeded by his son Qu Zhisheng (麴智盛). Rejecting a proposal by some of his generals to ambush the Gaochang nobles when they were burying Qu Wentai (finding that doing so would be immoral), he put Gaochang's capital under siege, forcing Qu Zhisheng to surrender. Emperor Taizong annexed Gaochang territory except for three cities, which Gaochang had seized from Yanqi, and therefore were returned to Yanqi after the king of Yanqi met with Hou to congratulate him), and Hou returned to the Tang capital Chang'an with Qu Zhisheng and his subordinates as captives.

Upon Hou's return to Chang'an, however, he found himself in trouble, as it was alleged that Hou had taken for himself treasures from the Gaochang imperial treasury and forced certain Gaochang captives to be his slaves. The other generals, seeing Hou's example, also did likewise, and he was in no position to stop them. Emperor Taizong, when he found out about these events, put Hou and some of his generals under arrest less than 10 days after their return to Chang'an. However, upon the advice of the official Cen Wenben, Emperor Taizong released Hou.

== Death ==
Hou Junji was resentful that, despite his great achievement, he was put under arrest, albeit briefly. In the spring of 643, when fellow general Zhang Liang was sent out of the capital to serve as the commandant at Luo Prefecture (洛州, roughly modern Luoyang, Henan), Hou tried to provoke Zhang by asking him, "Who squeezed you out?" Zhang, in jest, responded, "Other than you, who can squeeze me out?" Hou responded, "I conquered a kingdom, but I ran into someone throwing a temper tantrum big enough to overturn a house. What strength do I have to squeeze you out?" He then rolled up his sleeves and yelled, "I am so unhappy that I would rather die. Do you want to commit treason? I will commit treason with you!" Zhang secretly reported this exchange to Emperor Taizong, but Emperor Taizong pointed out that this was a private conversation with no corroboration, and took no action on it.

In 643, when Emperor Taizong commissioned the Portraits at Lingyan Pavilion to commemorate the 24 great contributors to Tang rule, Hou's was one of portraits commissioned.

Around the same time, however, Emperor Taizong's crown prince Li Chengqian was becoming fearful because Emperor Taizong had greatly favored another son, Li Tai the Prince of Wei, and Li Tai was making designs on the crown prince position. Li Chengqian therefore gathered a group of political and military officials around him to consider overthrowing his father, including his uncle Li Yuanchang (李元昌) the Prince of Han, his cousin Zhao Jie (趙節), and brother-in-law Du He (杜荷, Du Ruhui's son). Hou's son-in-law Helan Chushi (賀蘭楚石), the commander of Li Chengqian's guards, was also part of the plot, and through Helan, Li Chengqian invited Hou to join the plot as well, as Hou agreed. However, he was deeply disturbed by his own involvement, and he developed insomnia. His wife sensed that something was wrong, and told him, "You, Duke, are an important official of the state, so why are you acting like this? If there is something you are doing wrong, you should report yourself so that your life can be spared." However, Hou did not do so.

However, Li Chengqian's plot was betrayed by his guard Gegan Chengji (紇干承基), and after an investigation ordered by Emperor Taizong and conducted by Zhangsun Wuji, Fang Xuanling, Xiao Yu, Li Shiji, as well as responsible officials from the supreme court and the legislative and examination bureaus of government, Li Chengqian was removed. The other conspirators, including Hou, were sentenced to death. Emperor Taizong initially considered commuting Hou's death sentence because of his accomplishments, but the other officials opposed, and Emperor Taizong stated to Hou, "I have to bid you, Duke, farewell. From now, I can only see your portrait!" Both he and Hou wept. As Hou was about to be beheaded, he stated to the general overseeing the execution, "I, Hou Junji, am not the type to commit treason, but I stumbled many times and reached this point. But as I destroyed two kingdoms as a general, please speak for me to His Imperial Majesty to request that I could have a son remaining to carry on the lineage, on the basis of my accomplishments." Emperor Taizong, when he heard this, pardoned Hou's wife and children but exiled them to the modern Guangdong region, and confiscated his properties.

It was said that years earlier, after Emperor Taizong ordered Li Jing to teach Hou strategies, Hou reported to Emperor Taizong, "Li Jing is about to commit treason." When Emperor Taizong asked him why, Hou responded, "Li Jing only teaches me basic principles and does not teach me the best strategies, keeping them for himself." When Emperor Taizong asked Li Jing about this, Li Jing responded, "This is proof that Hou Junji will commit treason. China is secure right now, and the empire is united. What I taught him is sufficient to use against barbarians. If not for treasonous purposes, why would Hou want to learn all of the strategies?" At one point, Li Daozong also spoke to Emperor Taizong, stating, "Hou Junji has too much ambition and too little talent. He overvalued his achievements and found it shameful to be lower in position than Fang Xuanling and Li Jing. Even though he serves as a minister, he finds the position insufficient. I believe one day he will create a disturbance." Emperor Taizong responded, "Hou Junji is very talented and capable of serving in any position. It is not that I am unwilling to give him the highest post; it is just that it is not yet his turn. How can I distrust him and believe that he will commit treason?" After Hou was put to death, Emperor Taizong apologized to Li Daozong.

== Notes ==
- Old Book of Tang, vol. 69.
- New Book of Tang, vol. 94.
- Zizhi Tongjian, vols. 191, 193, 194, 195, 196, 197.
