= Xiá Prefecture =

Historical administrative division in Hubei, China

Xiázhou or Xiá Prefecture (written as 硤州 before the 10th century, and 峽州 thereafter) was a zhou (prefecture) in imperial China centering on modern Yichang, Hubei, China. It existed (intermittently) from the 6th century to 1376.

== Geography ==
The administrative region of Xiá Prefecture in the Tang dynasty is under the administration of modern Yichang, Hubei. It probably includes parts of modern:

- Yichang
- Yidu
- Changyang Tujia Autonomous County
- Yuan'an County
