= Murong Shun =

Murong Shun (Chinese: 慕容順) (died 635), regal title Zhugulüwugandou Khan (趉故呂烏甘豆可汗) or, in short, Gandou Khan (甘豆可汗), Tang dynasty noble title Prince of Xiping (西平王), was briefly a khan of the Xianbei-led state of Tuyuhun. He would have been expected to be the crown prince of his father, the Busabo Khan Murong Fuyun, as the oldest son of his wife Princess Guanghua of the Sui dynasty, but was bypassed, and in 635, with Tuyuhun under attack by Tang, he headed a group of nobles who surrendered to Tang and was subsequently created khan to succeed his father (who was killed in flight). However, he did not receive support from his people and was assassinated later that year. He was succeeded by his son Murong Nuohebo (Ledou Khan).

== Background ==
It is not known when Murong Shun was born, but it was known that he was the oldest son of the Busabo Khan Murong Fuyun and Sui dynasty's Princess Guanghua, who had first married Murong Shun's uncle Murong Shifu in 596 when Murong Shifu was khan. In 597, after Murong Shifu was assassinated, Murong Fuyun became khan, and pursuant to Tuyuhun customs, married Princess Guanghua as his wife.

== During Sui dynasty ==
In 604, Emperor Wen of Sui, who had initially married Princess Guanghua to Murong Shifu and who had later approved her marriage to Murong Fuyun, died, and was succeeded by his son Yang Guang (as Emperor Yang). In 607, Emperor Yang started considering conquering Tuyuhun, after his official Pei Ju convinced him that it would be easy to do so. When, on one occasion, Murong Fuyun sent Murong Shun as an emissary to Sui, Emperor Yang detained him as a hostage.

In 608 and 609, Emperor Yang launched major attacks on Tuyuhun, taking over its lands and forcing Murong Fuyun to flee. Emperor Yang instead created Murong Shun as khan and had a Tuyuhun prince, Ni Luozhou (尼洛周) the Prince of Dabao, serve as Murong Shun's assistant, hoping that Murong Shun can take over Tuyuhun. However, on the way back to Tuyuhun lands, Ni was assassinated, and Murong Shun returned to Sui, which, in later years, began collapsing as it was engulfed by agrarian rebellions.

In 618, Murong Shun was accompanying Emperor Yang at Jiangdu (江都, in modern Yangzhou, Jiangsu), when Emperor Yang was killed in a coup led by the general Yuwen Huaji. Murong Shun subsequently returned to the Sui capital Chang'an, which was then under the control of the rebel general Li Yuan the Prince of Tang, who had declared Emperor Yang's grandson Yang You the Prince of Dai as emperor (as Emperor Gong).

== During Tang dynasty ==
Later in 618, Li Yuan had Yang You yield the throne to him, establishing the Tang dynasty as its Emperor Gaozu. As he was fighting over the supremacy of China with many other rebel rulers, he made overtures to Murong Fuyun, who had by that point taken back the Sui-seized Tuyuhun lands, asking Murong Fuyun to attack one of his rivals, Li Gui the Emperor of Liang. Murong Fuyun agreed, and requested that Murong Shun be released to him. Emperor Gaozu agreed, and in 619 Murong Shun returned to Tuyuhun. However, the return was not a happy one for Murong Shun, who, as Princess Guanghua's oldest son, expected to be crown prince, but in Murong Shun's long absence, Murong Fuyun had already created another son crown prince. He only created Murong Shun the Prince of Daning, and Murong Shun was not pleased.

Despite this initial alliance between Tang and Tuyuhun, peace did not last even before, and did not last after, Tang's reunification of China, which by 623 was largely complete, as Murong Fuyun, under the advice of his strategist the Prince of Tianzhu, was making several pillaging attacks on Tang every year for the rest of Emperor Gaozu's reign, which ended in 626 as he was forced to abdicate to his son Li Shimin (as Emperor Taizong). The attacks were less frequent thereafter, but were still ongoing.

In 635, under the general Li Jing, Tang forces made a major crippling attack on Tuyuhun, forcing Murong Fuyun to flee. The Tuyuhun nobles were resentful of the Prince of Tianzhu, and Murong Shun led them in killing the Prince of Tianzhu and then surrendering. As Murong Fuyun was killed by his subordinates during flight, Emperor Taizong created Murong Shun the dual titles of Prince of Xiping and Zhugulüwugandou Khan (or Gandou Khan in short), to succeed Murong Fuyun.

== Brief reign as khan ==
However, Murong Shun's reign was short and turbulent, as it was said that the people did not respect him due to his having served as a hostage for a long time in China, and the turbulence did not subside even though, for a time, Tang forces commanded by the general Li Daliang were in Tuyuhun, assisting him. Late in 635, he was assassinated. His son Murong Nuohebo the Prince of Yan succeeded him, and managed to survive the crisis with aid from the Tang general Hou Junji.

Regnal titles
Preceded by Murong Fuyun (Busabo Khan)	Ruler of Tuyuhun; 635	Succeeded by Murong Nuohebo (Ledou Khan)
