= Murong Fuyun =

7th-century ruler of the dynastic state of Tuyuhun

Murong Fuyun (Chinese: 慕容伏允; 597–635), regnal name Busabo Khan (Chinese: 步薩鉢可汗), was a ruler of the Xianbei-led dynastic state of Tuyuhun. He first became ruler when his brother Murong Shifu was assassinated in 597, and became one of the longest-ruling monarchs of Tuyuhun. His reign was characterized by numerous major conflicts with the Sui and Tang dynasties. In 635, during a Tang invasion, he was assassinated due to the people's resentment of his hostile attitude toward the Emperor Taizong of Tang that led to the invasion.

== Background ==
Murong Fuyun's father Murong Kualü's reign (r. 540–591) as khan had been a turbulent one, particularly late in his reign, when even his crown princes were said to have been fearful for their deaths. He was constantly attacking the provinces of the Sui dynasty located on the border with Tuyuhun, although after the Sui dynasty conquered the Chen dynasty in 589, Murong Kualü was fearful and vacated the border region. He died in 591 and was succeeded by Murong Fuyun's older brother Murong Shifu, who offered to submit to the Emperor Wen of Sui and further to offer a daughter to serve as Emperor Wen's concubine—which Emperor Wen (who had very few, if any, concubines, due to his love for his wife Empress Dugu) declined. However, after that, there was a time of peace between Tuyuhun and Sui. Indeed, in 596, Emperor Wen created the daughter of a clansman Princess Guanghua and married her to Murong Shifu.

For reasons lost to history, there was a major disturbance in Tuyuhun in 597, and Murong Shifu was assassinated. The people supported Murong Fuyun as khan. He sent emissaries to Sui to explain the situation and to ask for permission to, pursuant to Tuyuhun customs, marry Princess Guanghua as well. Emperor Wen agreed. (He and Princess Guanghua thereafter had at least one son, Murong Shun.)

== During Emperor Yang of Sui's reign ==
Emperor Wen died in 604 and was succeeded by his son Yang Guang (as Emperor Yang), and initially, the relationship between Tuyuhun and Sui remained peaceful, with Murong Fuyun sending emissaries to submit tributes to Emperor Yang in 607, along with emissaries from Gaochang and the khan of Eastern Tujue himself, the Qimin Khan Ashina Ran'gan. However, later that year, the Sui official Pei Ju returned from a tour of the Xiyu states, and knowing that Emperor Yang was looking for targets to conquer, suggested to him that Xiyu states had a lot of treasures and that Tuyuhun was easy to conquer. Emperor Yang started considering attacking Tuyuhun, as a result. At one point, when Murong Fuyun sent Murong Shun as an emissary to Sui, Emperor Yang detained him.

In 608, Pei persuaded the Tiele tribes to attack Tuyuhun, and Tiele forces defeated Tuyuhun forces. Murong Fuyun took his people east, entering Sui's Xiping Commandery (西平, roughly modern Xining, Qinghai) to ask for refuge and aid against the Tiele. Emperor Yang sent his cousin Yang Xiong (楊雄) the Prince of Ande and Yuwen Shu the Duke of Xu to escort Murong Fuyun. As Yuwen's forces approached, however, Murong Fuyun became apprehensive of the strength of his forces and decided to flee. Yuwen attacked him, and was said to have killed 3,000 Tuyuhun soldiers, and captured some 200 Tuyuhun nobles and 4,000 households. Murong Fuyun fled southwest into the mountains. Sui took over former Tuyuhun lands and divided it into four commanderies, settling minor criminals in those lands.

By 609, however, Murong Fuyun appeared to have exited the mountains and taken the land back, and Emperor Yang, this time commanding the army himself, again attacked Tuyuhun. Emperor Yang's forces, while suffering some minor setbacks, were again able to send Murong Fuyun fleeing, reaffirming Sui's control over the Tuyuhun lands. With Murong Shun in his hands, he created Murong Shun as khan and had him, assisted by Ni Luozhou (尼洛周) the Prince of Dabao, trying to head toward the Tuyuhun people to take over control. On the way, however, Ni was assassinated, and Murong Shun retreated back to Sui. In 613, Pei again persuaded the tribes submitting to Western Tujue's Heshana Khan to attack Tuyuhun.

Little is known about Tuyuhun's status under Murong Fuyun the next several years, but at the time, Sui itself was collapsing, engulfed in agrarian rebellions throughout its territory.

== During Emperor Gaozu of Tang's reign ==
By 619, Emperor Yang was dead, killed at Jiangdu (江都, in modern Yangzhou, Jiangsu), and Murong Shun, who had been with Emperor Yang at Jiangdu, had returned to the Sui capital Chang'an, then taken over by one of the generals who had rebelled against Emperor Yang, Li Yuan, who had also since then taken the throne and established a new state of Tang as its Emperor Gaozu, still fighting for supremacy of China with many other rebel rulers. Emperor Gaozu negotiated with Murong Fuyun, who had by now recovered the Tuyuhun lands, to attack one of his rivals, Li Gui the Emperor of Liang. Murong Fuyun agreed, and requested that Murong Shun be released. Emperor Gaozu agreed, and Murong Shun was able to return to Tuyuhun. (However, by this time, Murong Fuyun had already created another son to be his crown prince, and it was said that Murong Shun was depressed thereafter.)

Starting 622, Murong Fuyun, apparently under the advice of his strategist the Prince of Tianzhu, began frequent pillaging attacks on Tang's prefectures bordering Tuyuhun, making several attacks per year. The attacks continued throughout the rest of Emperor Gaozu's reign, up to 626 (when he was forced to abdicate in favor of his son Li Shimin (as Emperor Taizong)).

== During Emperor Taizong of Tang's reign ==
The Tuyuhun attacks appeared to decrease in frequency once Emperor Taizong took the throne, but did continue. Sometime before 634, Murong Fuyun appeared to make an overture toward peace—by sending an emissary to offer tributes to Emperor Taizong—but even before the emissary left, Tuyuhun forces attacked and pillaged Shan Prefecture (鄯州, in modern Haidong Prefecture, Qinghai). When Emperor Taizong sent emissaries to rebuke Murong Fuyun and summoned Murong Fuyun to Chang'an to meet him, Murong Fuyun refused, but responded by requesting that a Tang princess be given to his son, the Prince of Zun, in marriage. Emperor Taizong agreed, but ordered that the Prince of Zun personally arrive in Chang'an to marry the princess. When the Prince of Zun failed to do so, Emperor Taizong cancelled the marriage. Meanwhile, Murong Fuyun also attacked Lan and Kuo (廓州, also in modern Haidong) Prefectures and detained the Tang emissary Zhao Dekai (趙德楷). Emperor Taizong sent a number of emissaries to Tuyuhun to discuss the matter and also summoned Tuyuhun emissaries and personally had discussions with them. Murong Fuyun still did not relent.

In fall 634, Emperor Taizong sent the generals Duan Zhixuan (段志玄) and Fan Xing (樊興) to attack Tuyuhun with Tang forces, supplemented by soldiers from the Qibi (契苾) and Dangxiang tribes. When Duan began the attack, however, after minor successes, Tuyuhun forces simply began to elude him and refuse to engage him. Apparently immediately after he withdrew, Tuyuhun forces again attacked Liang Prefecture (涼州, roughly modern Wuwei, Gansu).

Around the new year 635, Emperor Taizong sent Li Jing to attack Tuyuhun again. In summer 635, Tang forces began engaging Tuyuhun forces, and after some minor victories by Li Jing's subordinate Li Daozong, Murong Fuyun, apparently following the same strategies he used against Duan, burned the grasses and fled. Most of Li Jing's subordinates believed that it was dangerous to venture further without adequate grazing supplies and advised withdrawal, but Hou Junji opposed the idea, pointing out that this was the opportunity to destroy Tuyuhun. Li Jing agreed, and divided his forces into two branches—with Li Jing himself and Xue Wanjun (薛萬均) and Li Daliang heading northwest, and Hou and Li Daozong heading southwest. Both prongs continued to be successful. Eventually, Li Jing received news of Murong Fuyun's location and surprised Murong Fuyun, defeating his remaining forces. Murong Fuyun himself managed to flee, but the nobles, led by Murong Shun, killed the Prince of Tianzhu and surrendered. Murong Fuyun, in flight, was killed by his subordinates. Emperor Taizong created Murong Shun the dual titles of Prince of Xiping and Zhugulüwugandou Khan (or Gandou Khan in short), to succeed Murong Fuyun.

== See also ==
- Emperor Taizong's campaign against Tuyuhun

== Notes ==
Regnal titles
Preceded by Murong Shifu	Ruler of Tuyuhun; 597–635	Succeeded by Murong Shun (Gandou Khan)
