= Murong Nuohebo =

- Traditional Chinese: 慕容諾曷鉢
- Simplified Chinese: 慕容诺曷鉢
Transcriptions
Standard Mandarin
- Hanyu Pinyin: Mùróng Nuòhébō
- Wade–Giles: Mu-jung No-ho-po

Wudiyebaledou Khan
- Traditional Chinese: 烏地也拔勒豆 可汗
- Simplified Chinese: 乌地也拔勒豆 可汗
Transcriptions
Standard Mandarin
- Hanyu Pinyin: Wūdìyěbálēidòu Kèhán
- Wade–Giles: Wu-ti-yeh-pa-lei-tou K'o-han

Ledou Khan
- Chinese: 勒豆可汗
Transcriptions
Standard Mandarin
- Hanyu Pinyin: Lēidòu Kèhán
- Wade–Giles: Lei-tou K'o-han

Prince of Qinghai
- Chinese: 青海王
- Literal meaning: Prince of Qinghai
Transcriptions
Standard Mandarin
- Hanyu Pinyin: Qīnghǎi Wàng
- Wade–Giles: Ch'ing-hai Wang

Murong Nuohebo (Chinese: 慕容諾曷鉢) (died 688), regnal name Wudiyebaledou Khan (烏地也拔勒豆可汗) or, in short, Ledou Khan (勒豆可汗), Tang dynasty noble title Prince of Qinghai (青海王), was the last khan of the Xianbei-ruled Tuyuhun state. He had become khan in 635 after his grandfather, the Busabo Khan Murong Fuyun and his father, the Gandou Khan Murong Shun, had both been killed in the same year: Murong Fuyun during a Tang invasion and Murong Shun assassinated by his own people in the aftermaths of the Tang conquest. Murong Nuohebo's control over his people was initially tenuous and required Tang military affirmation on at least two occasions, but once his control was firmer, he faced the threat of Tibetan Empire to the south-west. In 663, unable to stand Tibetan pressure, he took his people and requested refuge in Tang territory, and by 672, the Tibetan Empire had taken over all of former Tuyuhun territory. The Tuyuhun people were settled within Tang territory, and Murong Nuohebo was made a Tang prefect. While he continued to carry the title of khan until his death in 688, typically, Tuyuhun was considered destroyed by either 663 or 672.

== Background ==
It is not known when Murong Nuohebo was born. In 635, his grandfather, the Busabo Khan Murong Fuyun, who had been aggravating the Tang dynasty for years with border raids, drew a Tang reprisal attack, commanded by the general Li Jing, and was killed in flight. Murong Nuohebo's father Murong Shun surrendered and was created the Gandou Khan to succeed Murong Fuyun, but as Murong Shun had spent years in the Sui dynasty and his mother was Sui's Princess Guanghua, he was considered too sinicized and not supported by the people. Late in 635, he was assassinated. Murong Nuohebo, who was said to be young (although his age by that point is unknown), and who carried the title of Prince of Yan, became khan. The Emperor Taizong of Tang sent the general Hou Junji with Tang troops to help Murong Nuohebo pacify the Tuyuhun people.

== Reign ==
In spring 636, Murong Nuohebo sent emissaries to Tang, offering to submit as a vassal and sent a younger brother or brothers to serve as hostage. Emperor Taizong created him the dual titles of Prince of Heyuan and Wudiyebaledou Khan (or Ledou Khan in short).

By 638, however, Tuyuhun was under constant attack by Tibet, whose ruler Songtsen Gampo had become hostile toward Tuyuhun because he thought Murong Nuohebo had interfered with his attempt to seek a Tang princess in marriage, and his attacks captured much of Tuyuhun's people and forced the rest north of the Qinghai Lake. Tibet forces then attacked Tang as well, but were repelled by the Tang general Niu Jinda (牛進達), and, after receiving agreement from Emperor Taizong that a princess would be given to Songtsen Gampo in marriage, withdrew (that princess, Wencheng, would eventually marry Songtsen Gampo in 641).

In 639, Murong Nuohebo visited the Tang capital Chang'an. Emperor Taizong created the daughter of a clansman as Princess Honghua and gave her to Murong Nuohebo in marriage.

In or before 641, Murong Nuohebo's prime minister, the Prince of Xuan, had taken control of the government, and he planned to attack Princess Honghua and then seize her and Murong Nuohebo and surrender to Tibet. When Murong Nuohebo heard of this plot, he fled to his general the Prince of Weixin, then stationed at Shanshan. The Tang officer Xi Junmai (席君買) took this opportunity to ambush the Prince of Xuan and killed him and two of his brothers. Tuyuhun, however, was said to be thrown into a state of confusion, and Emperor Taizong sent the official Tang Jian (唐儉) to help Murong Nuohebo pacify the people.

In 652, Murong Nuohebo and Princess Guanghua both visited Chang'an, and Emperor Taizong's son and successor Emperor Gaozong created the daughter of a clansman the Lady of Jincheng and married her to Murong Nuohebo's oldest son Murong Sudumomo (慕容蘇度摸末). (At a later point, after Murong Sudumomo died, Emperor Gaozong created another daughter of a clansman the Lady of Jinming and married her to Murong Nuohebo's second son Murong Talumomo (慕容闒盧摸末).

== Flight to Tang territory ==
Meanwhile, the relationship between Tuyuhun and Tibet appeared to be largely peaceful for years, but in 660, the Tibet prime minister Gar Tongtsen Yulsung (Lu Dongzan, 祿東贊) had his son Gar Trinring Tsendro ("Lun Qinling" (論欽陵) or "Qizheng" (起政) in Chinese) resume attacks against Tuyuhun, on account of Tuyuhun's submission to Tang. Both Tibet and Tuyuhun sent emissaries to Tang accusing each other and asking for Tang assistance. Emperor Gaozong declined both requests. However, Tuyuhun was weakening in light of Tibet attacks, and in 663, the situation was exacerbated when the Tuyuhun official Suhe Gui (素和貴), accused of crimes, fled to Tibet and revealed many secrets about Tuyuhun. Tibet forces thereafter attacked Tuyuhun and defeated Tuyuhun forces. Murong Nuohebo and Princess Honghua abandoned Tuyuhun's territory and took the people to Tang's Liang Prefecture (涼州, roughly modern Wuwei, Gansu), requesting to settle within Tang territory. Emperor Gaozong sent the general Su Dingfang to command Tang forces to the west, to help protect Tuyuhun remnants, but carried out no actual military attacks against Tibet, although he sent emissaries to rebuke Tongtsen when Tongtsen subsequently sent emissaries to again make accusations against Tuyuhun and request another marriage with Tang. In 665, when Tibet made a peace overture, requesting a marriage treaty with Tuyuhun and also permission to graze in the Chishui (赤水, probably the headwaters area of the Yellow River) area, Emperor Gaozong rejected the proposal. Around 666, Emperor Gaozong created Murong Nuohebo the Prince of Qinghai—a greater title than the title of Prince of Heyuan—perhaps to try to show Tibet that he still intended to restore Tuyuhun. In 669, Emperor Gaozong decreed that the Tuyuhun people be settled in the Qilian Mountains, but many officials opined that this would expose them to Tibet attacks and that an attack against Tibet would be necessary first. The Tang chancellor Yan Liben opposed on account that much of Tang had suffered through a crop failure in 668 and could not afford a major military campaign, and thereafter, the Tuyuhun people were not settled in the Qilian.

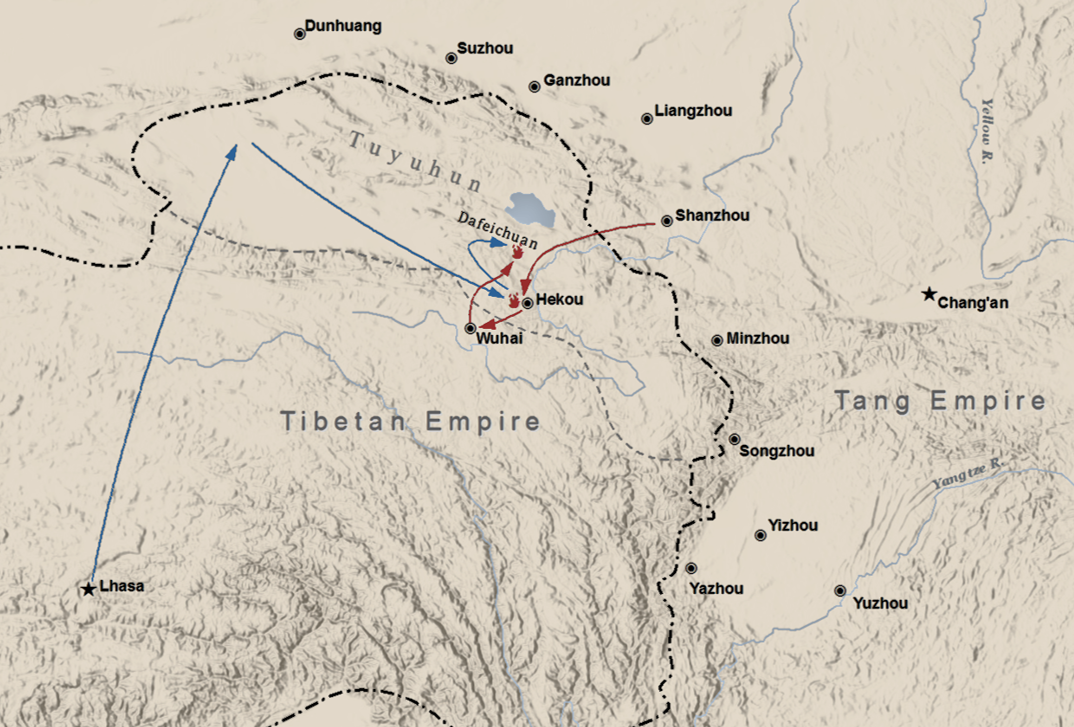
Battle of Dafeichuan between Tang and Tibetans in order to restore the Tuyuhun kingdom.

In 670, Tibet launched a major attack on Tang's Anxi Protectorate, capturing 18 prefectures from Tang. In response, Emperor Gaozong sent the general Xue Rengui, assisted by the generals Ashina Daozhen (阿史那道真) and Guo Daifeng (郭待封) with the stated missions of recapturing the Tuyuhun lands to permit the Tuyuhun people to return to their territory. However, the campaign was plagued by disagreements between Xue and Guo, and Tang forces eventually suffered a major defeat by Tongtsen's son and successor Gar Trinring at the Battle of Dafeichuan, ending hopes of allowing the Tuyuhun people to return. In 672, Emperor Gaozong, apparently giving up on the idea, settled the Tuyuhun people at Shanzhou (鄯州, in modern Haidong Prefecture, Qinghai), but even Shan Prefecture was considered too exposed to Tibet attacks, and so soon the Tuyuhun people were settled in Lingzhou (靈州, roughly modern Yinchuan, Ningxia), but establishing a separate prefecture for them—Anlezhou (安樂州). Murong Nuohebo was made its prefect. (There is thus a split among historians between treating 663 or 672 as the end of Tuyuhun's existence as a state.)

Murong Nuohebo died in 688. His son Murong Zhong (慕容忠) inherited his titles, and the titles were passed on for at least four more generations before the line died out and the titles were abolished, even though there was no longer any realistic chance for Tuyuhun's restoration.

Regnal titles
Preceded by Murong Shun (Gandou Khan)	Ruler of Tuyuhun; 635–672	Succeeded by None (dynasty destroyed)
