= Tuyuhun =

Kingdom in modern Qinghai, China (284–670)

Tuyuhun 吐谷渾
- 284–670
- Asia in 576 AD, showing Tuyuhun and its neighbours.
- Status: Kingdom
- Capital: Fuqi (in modern Gonghe, Qinghai)
- Common languages: Tuyuhun
- Government: Monarchy
- Khagan
  - 284–317: Murong Tuyuhun
  - 635–672: Murong Nuohebo
- History
  - Established: 284
  - Vassal of the Tang dynasty: 634
  - Destroyed by the Tibetan Empire: 670
Succeeded by
Tibetan Empire
- Today part of: China

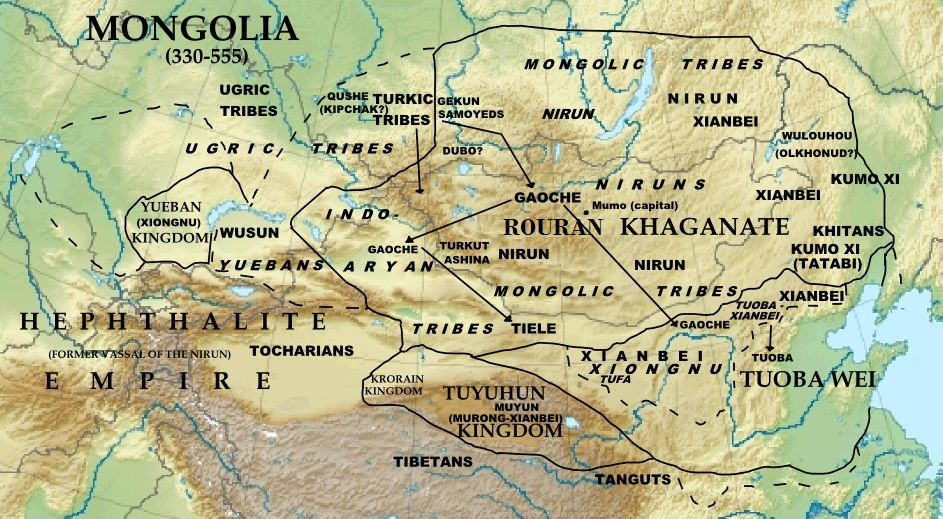
Rouran Khaganate, Tuyuhun, Yueban and Northern Wei

Tuyuhun (Chinese: 吐谷渾; LHC: *tʰɑʔ-jok-guən; Wade-Giles: T'u-yühun), also known as Henan (Chinese: 河南) and Azha (Tibetan: ཨ་ཞ་, Wylie: ‘A-zha; Chinese: 阿豺), was a dynastic monarchy established by the nomadic peoples related to the Xianbei in the Qilian Mountains and upper Yellow River valley. Its territory spanned what is now Qinghai and Gansu of China. The kingdom was defeated and absorbed by the Tibetan Empire in the mid-7th century.

== History ==
After the disintegration of the Xianbei state, nomadic groups were led by their khagan, Murong Tuyuhun (慕容吐谷渾; 246–317), to the rich pasture lands around Qinghai Lake about the middle of the 3rd century AD.

Murong Tuyuhun was the older brother of the Former Yan's ancestor Murong Hui and elder son of the chanyu Murong Shegui (慕容涉歸) of the Murong Xianbei who took his people from their original settlements on the Liaodong Peninsula to the Yin Mountains, crossing the Yellow River between 307 and 313, and into the eastern region of modern Qinghai.

The Tuyuhun Empire was established in 284 by subjugating the native peoples referred to as the Qiang, including more than 100 different and loosely coordinated tribes that did not submit to each other or any authority.

After Tuyuhun died in Linxia, Gansu in 317, his sixty sons further expanded the empire by defeating the Western Qin (385–430) and Xia (407–431) kingdoms. The Qinghai Xianbei, Tufa Xianbei, Qifu Xianbei and Haolian Xianbei joined them. They moved their capital 6 kilometres (3.7 mi) west of Qinghai Lake.

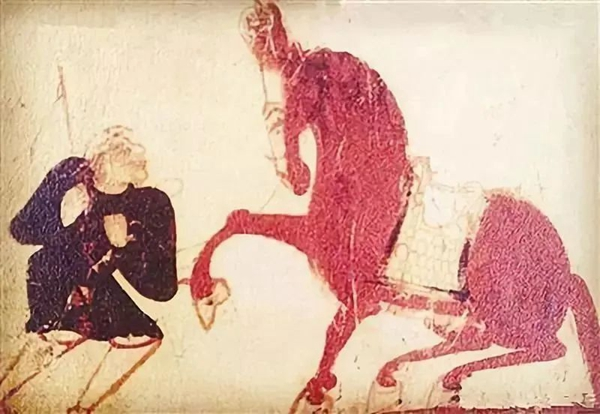
Tuyuhun man taming a horse, 6th century.

These Xianbei groups formed the core of the Tuyuhun Empire and numbered about 3.3 million at their peak. They carried out extensive military expeditions westward, reaching as far as Hotan in Xinjiang and the borders of Kashmir and Afghanistan, and established a vast empire that encompassed Qinghai, Gansu, Ningxia, northern Sichuan, eastern Shaanxi, southern Xinjiang, and most of Tibet, stretching 1,500 kilometres (930 mi) from east to west and 1,000 kilometres (620 mi) from north to south. They unified parts of Inner Asia for the first time in history, developed the southern route of the Silk Road, and promoted cultural exchange between the eastern and western territories, dominating the northwest for more than three and half centuries until it was destroyed by the Tibetan Empire. For most of its history, Tuyuhun existed as an independent state.

=== Conflict between the Tang and Tibetan empires ===
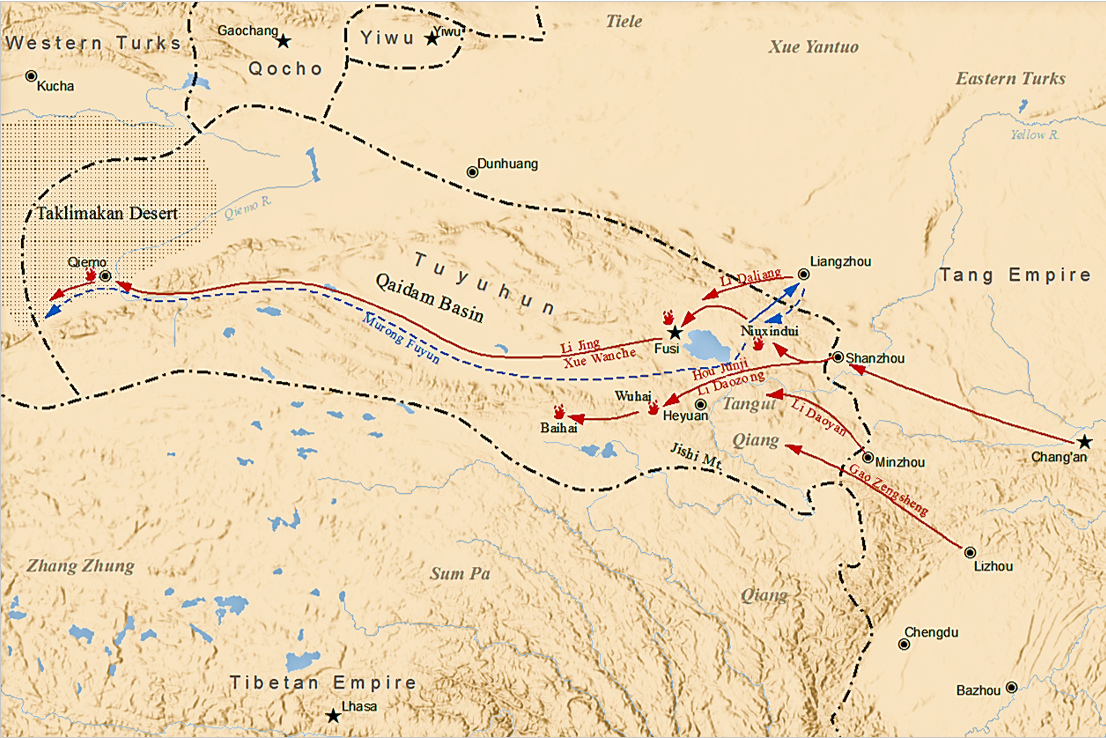
Emperor Taizong's campaign against Tuyuhun in 634 AD

During the beginning of the Tang dynasty, the Tuyuhun Empire came to a gradual decline and was increasingly caught in the conflict between the Tang and the Tibetan Empire. Because the Tuyuhun controlled the crucial trade routes between east and the west, the empire became the immediate target of invasion by the Tang.

The Tibetan Empire developed rapidly under the leadership of Songtsen Gampo, who united the Tibetans and expanded northward, directly threatening the Tuyuhun Empire. Soon after he took the throne of the Yarlung Kingdom in Central Tibet in 634, he defeated the Tuyuhun near Qinghai Lake and received an envoy from the Tang. The Tibetan emperor requested marriage to a Tang princess, but was refused. In 635–636 the Emperor Taizong of Tang defeated the Tibetan army; after this campaign, the Emperor Taizong agreed to provide a Tang princess to Songtsen Gampo.

The Tibetan emperor, who claimed that the Tuyuhun objected to his marriage with the Tang, sent 200,000 troops to attack. The Tuyuhun troops retreated to Qinghai, whereas the Tibetans went eastward to attack the Tangut people and reached into southern Gansu. The Tang government sent troops to fight. Although the Tibetans withdrew in response, the Tuyuhun Empire lost much of its territory in southern Gansu to Tibetans.

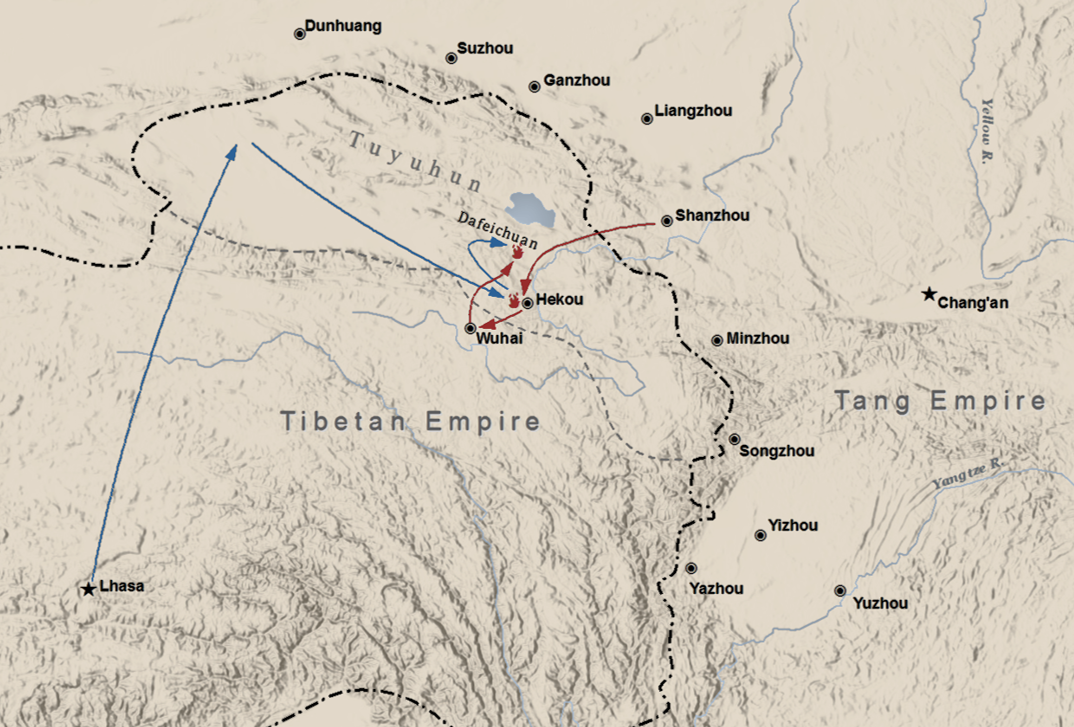
Battle of Dafeichuan

The Tuyuhun government was split between the pro-Tang and pro-Tibet factions, with the latter increasingly becoming stronger and collaborated with Tibet to bring about an invasion. The Tang sent general Xue Rengui to lead 100,000 troops to fight Tibet in Dafeichuan (modern Gonghe County, Qinghai). They were annihilated by the ambush of 200,000 troops led by Dayan and the Tibetans. The Tibetan Empire took over the entire territory of the Tuyuhun.

=== Disintegration ===
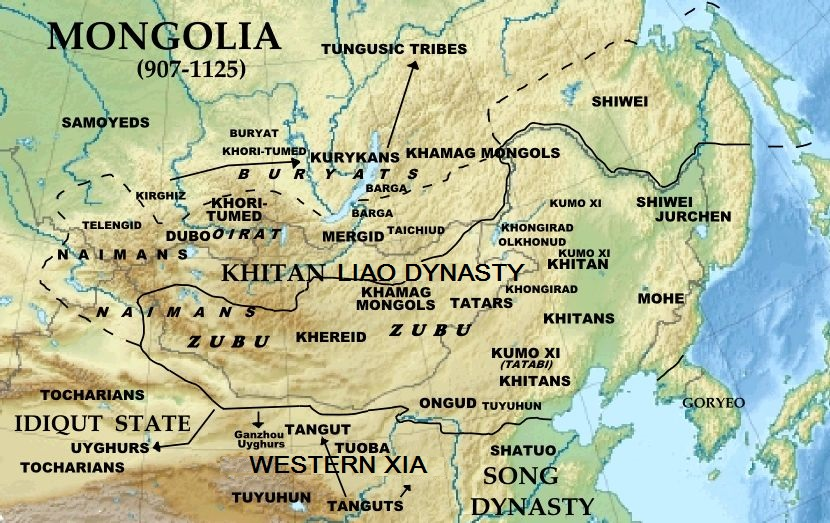
Remnants of Tuyuhun in northern Hebei and northern Qinghai (907–1125)

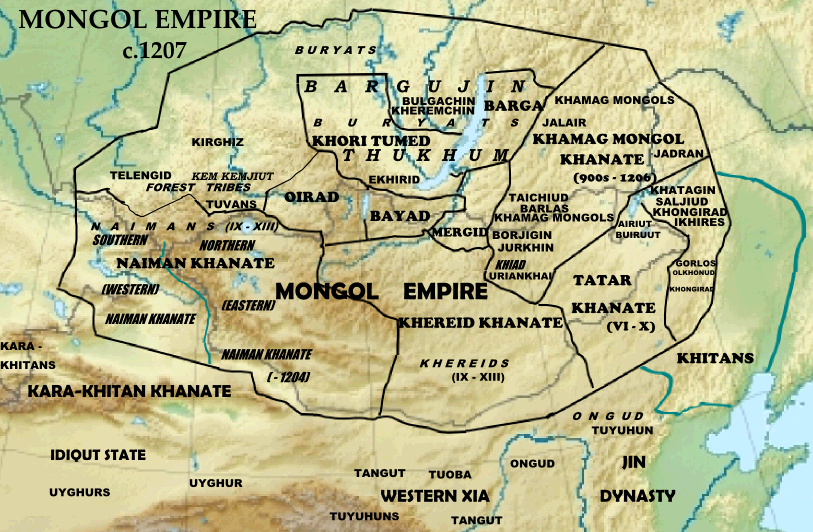
Remnants of Tuyuhun in northern Hebei and northern Qinghai (1207)

After the fall of the kingdom, the Tuyuhun people split. Led by Murong Nuohebo on the eastern side of the Qilian Mountains they migrated eastwards into central China. The rest remained and were under the rule of the Tibetan Empire.

Through this period, the Xianbei underwent massive diasporata over a vast territory that stretched from the northwest into central and eastern parts of China, with the greatest concentrations by Mount Yin near the Ordos Loop. In 946, a Shatuo, Liu Zhiyuan, conspired to murder the highest Xianbei leader, Bai Chengfu, who was reportedly so wealthy that "his horses had silver mangers". With the looted wealth that included an abundance of property and thousands of fine horses, Liu established the Later Han (947–950). The incident took away the central leadership and stripped the opportunity for the Xianbei to restore the Tuyuhun Kingdom, although later they were able to establish the Western Xia (1038–1227), which was destroyed by the Mongols.

== Language ==
Alexander Vovin (2015) identifies the extinct Tuyuhun language as a Para-Mongolic language, meaning that Tuyuhun is related to Mongolic as a sister clade but is not directly descended from the Proto-Mongolic language. The Khitan language is also a Para-Mongolic language.

== Culture ==
When the Chinese pilgrim Songyun visited the region in 518, he noted that the people had a written language, which was more than a hundred years before Thonmi Sambhota is said to have returned from India after developing a script for writing the Tibetan language.

== Rulers ==
Regal names	Family names and given name	Durations of reigns
Henan King (河南王)	Mùróng Tǔyùhún (慕容吐谷渾)	284–317
Henan King (河南王)	Mùróng Tǔyán (慕容吐延 )	317–329
Tuyuhun King (吐谷渾王)	Mùróng Yèyán (慕容葉延)	329–351
Tuyuhun King (吐谷渾王)	Mùróng Suìxī (慕容碎奚)	351–371
Bailan King (白蘭王)	Mùróng Shìlián (慕容視連)	371–390
Tuyuhun King (吐谷渾王)	Mùróng Shìpí (慕容視羆)	390–400
Da Chanyu (大單于)	Mùróng Wūgētí (慕容烏紇褆)	400–405
Wuyin Khan (戊寅可汗)/ Da Chanyu (大單于)/ Wu King (武王)	Mùróng Shùluògān (慕容樹洛干)	405–417
Bailan King (白蘭王)	Mùróng Āchái (慕容阿柴)	417–424
Hui King (惠王)/ King of Longxi (隴西王)	Mùróng Mùguī (慕容慕璝)	424–436
Henan King (河南王)	Mùróng Mùlìyán (慕容慕利延)	436–452
Henan King (河南王)/ Xiping King (西平王)	Mùróng Shíyín (慕容拾寅)	452–481
Henan King (河南王)	Mùróng Dùyìhóu (慕容度易侯)	481–490
	Mùróng Fúliánchóu (慕容伏連籌)	490–540
Khan	Mùróng Kuālǔ (慕容夸呂)	540–591
Khan	Mùróng Shìfú (慕容世伏)	591–597
Busabo Khan (步薩鉢可汗)	Mùróng Fúyǔn	597–635
Zhugulüwugandou Khan (趉故呂烏甘豆可汗)/ Daning King (大寧王)/ Xiping Commandery King (西平郡王)	Mùróng Shùn	635
Wudiyebaledou Khan (烏地也拔勒豆可汗)/ Heyuan Commandery King (河源郡王)	Mùróng Nuòhébō	635–672

== Rulers family tree ==
Tuyuhun rulers family tree

Murong; Tuyuhun 慕容吐谷浑; 246-284-317
Murong Tuyan 慕容吐延 ?-317-329
Murong Yeyan 慕容葉延; 319-329-351
Murong Suixi 慕容碎奚 ?-351-371
Murong Shilian 慕容視連 ?-371-390
Murong Shipi 慕容視羆; 368-390-400	Murong Wugeti 慕容烏紇褆 ?-400-405
Murong; Shuluogan 慕容樹洛干; 392-405-417	Tuhuzhen 吐护真	Murong Achai 慕容阿柴 ?-417-424	Dangqi 宕岂	Murong Mugui 慕容慕璝 ?-424-436	Murong; Muliyan 慕容慕利延 ?-436-452
Shiqian 拾虔	Murong; Shiyin 慕容拾寅 ?-452-481	Shigui 拾归	Shipi 拾皮	Weidai 纬代 ?－444	Chiliyan 叱力延	Toutui 头颓	Yuanxu 元绪	Beinang 被囊	Fanni 繁暱	Qióng 琼	Huan 瑍
Murong; Duyihou 慕容度易侯 ?-481-490	Feidoujin 费斗斤
Murong; Fulianchou 慕容伏連籌 ?-490-540
Helutou 贺鲁头	Murong; Heluozhen 呵羅真 ?-529-530	Murong Kualu 慕容夸呂 ?-540-591
Murong Fofu 佛輔 ?-530-534	Kebohan 可博汗	Weiwanghe 嵬王诃	Murong Shifu 慕容世伏 ?-591-597	Murong Fuyun 慕容伏允 ?-597-635
Murong; Ketazhen 可沓振 ?-534-540	Zunwang 尊王	Murong Shun 慕容顺; 604-635
Murong; Nuohebo 慕容諾曷鉢 ?-635-672-688
Murong Zhong 慕容忠; 648-698	Talumomo 闼卢摸末	Murong; Sudumomo 蘇度摸末
Murong; Xuanchao 慕容宣超	Murong; Xuanchang 慕容宣昌; 681－706	Murong Xuanche 慕容宣彻 ?－709	Murong Chengfu 慕容承福
Murong Xihao 慕容曦皓; 708－762	Murong Xiang 慕容相 ?－763
Murong Zhao 慕容兆
Murong Fu 慕容复

== See also ==
- Emperor Taizong's campaign against Tuyuhun
- List of Bronze Age states
- List of Classical Age states
- List of Iron Age states
- List of medieval great powers
- Tsongkha
- Tuyuhun invasion of Gansu

== Works cited ==
- Beckwith, Christopher I. (2009). Empires of the Silk Road: A History of Central Eurasia from the Bronze Age to the Present. Princeton University Press. ISBN 978-0-691-13589-2.
- Beckwith, Christopher I. (1993). The Tibetan Empire in Central Asia: A History of the Struggle for Great Power Among Tibetans, Turks, Arabs, and Chinese During the Early Middle Ages. Princeton University Press. ISBN 0-691-02469-3.
