= Yuwen Zhiji =

- Chinese: 宇文智及
Transcriptions
Standard Mandarin
- Hanyu Pinyin: Yǔwén Zhìjí
- Wade–Giles: Yu-wen Chih-chi

Yuwen Zhiji (died 619) was a military officer of the Sui dynasty. He was the son of Yuwen Shu, the Duke of Xu. He was the younger brother of Yuwen Huaji and older brother of Yuwen Huiji (宇文惠及). He had another younger half-brother Yuwen Shiji. His ancestors were from Xiongnu descent with the surname Pòyětóu (破野头). The Poyetous later were naturalized to Xianbei ethnicity and changed their surname to Yuwen (宇文).

In 616, after Shu's death, Emperor Yang made Yuwen Huaji protector-general of the right camp (右屯衛将軍) and Zhiji supervisor of indequity (将作少監).

In 618, Zhiji with his brother Huaji conspired with the officers of Xiaoguo Army (驍果军)—Sima Dekan (司馬德戡), Zhiji's friend Zhao Xingshu (趙行枢), Xue Shiliang (薛世良), Zhiji's nephew Yang Shilan (楊士覧)—to announce Emperor Yang and killed his youngest son Yang Gao. Emperor Yang was strangled to death by Linghu Xingda (令狐行達). A number of high-level officials, including the prime minister Yu Shiji, Pei Yun (裴蘊), Lai Hu'er (來護兒), Yuan Chong (袁充), Yuwen Xie (宇文協), Yuwen Jiong (宇文皛), and Xiao Ju (蕭矩) the Duke of Liang (the nephew of Emperor Yang's wife Empress Xiao), were also put to death. The Xiaoguo Army declared Yang Hao—son of Prince Yang Jun, Emperor Yang's younger brother—the emperor.

Zhiji was made Deputy minister of the Left (左僕射) and went to the North with Huaji. They were obstructed by Wang Shichong's, Li Yuan's, Li Mi's and other forces. Huaji then poisoned Yang Hao and made his base Weixian, declared himself the Emperor of Xu (許帝). He appointed his allies officials, and Zhiji the King of Qi (齐王).

In 619, Yuwen Huaji was defeated at Liaocheng by Dou Jiande. The Yuwen brothers—except Yuwen Shiji, who was then with Feng Deyi in Jibei (济北)—alongside with Yang Shilan, Xu Hongren (許弘仁), Meng Jing (孟景), Yuan Wuda (元武達) were executed. Their severed heads were exposed at the castle's gate.

== Sources ==
- History of the Northern Dynasties, Volume 74 (Biography #62 in Chinese Wikisource)
- Book of Sui, Volume 85 (Biography #50 in Chinese Wikisource)
- Book of Sui, Book 6, Zhonghua Book Company (Beijing), 1973, pp1888–1892, ISBN 7-101-00316-8
