= Zhiji =

Zhiji may refer to any of the following:

- IM Motors (pinyin: Zhìjǐ), a Chinese electric car manufacturer
- Liu Zhiji, a Chinese historian and politician of the Tang dynasty
- Yuwen Zhiji, a military officer of the Sui dynasty

== See also ==
- Jiutou Zhiji Jing, a yaojing and a character from the famed classic Chinese novel Investiture of the Gods
