= Yu Shinan =

Chinese official and calligrapher (558–638)

Yu Shinan 虞世南
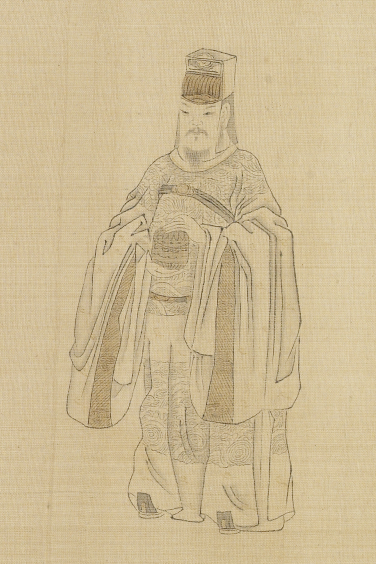
- Born: 558; Yuyao, Zhejiang
- Died: 11 July 638 (aged 79–80)
- Other names: Boshi (伯施); Duke Wenyi of Yongxing (永興文懿公)
- Occupations: Calligrapher, politician
- Children: Yu Xu; Yu Xiuyao; one other daughter
- Father: Yu Li
- Relatives: Yu Ji (uncle); Yu Shiji (elder brother)

Yu Shinan (558 – 11 July 638), courtesy name Boshi, posthumously known as Duke Wenyi of Yongxing, was a Chinese calligrapher and politician who lived in the early Tang dynasty and rose to prominence during the reign of Emperor Taizong. His uncle, Yu Ji (虞寄), also served in the Tang imperial court as an Imperial Secretary. He is regarded as one of the four greatest calligraphers in the early Tang dynasty along with Ouyang Xun, Chu Suiliang and Xue Ji, and one of the more famous ones in the history of Chinese calligraphy. Emperor Taizong once mentioned that Yu Shinan was "a man of five absolute merits", referring to his virtuous behavior, loyalty, erudition, writings and calligraphy.
