= Yu Shiji =

Chinese politician, poet, and calligrapher

Yu Shiji (虞世基; before 558 – 11 April 618), courtesy name Maoshi (懋世 or 茂世), (Note: The Book of Sui gave his courtesy name as 茂世, while the History of Northern Dynasties gave it as 懋世 (both rendered "Maoshi" in pinyin).) was a Chinese calligrapher, poet, and politician who served Emperor Yang of the Sui dynasty as a de facto chief minister from 607 to 618. Acclaimed for his skill in the literary arts of rhapsody and calligraphy, Yu began his career as an official of the Chen dynasty and held prestigious positions in the imperial administration before Sui forces conquered Chen in 589. He subsequently entered Sui service as a low-ranking official, supporting himself financially by working as a calligrapher-for-hire. After Emperor Yang ascended to the throne, Yu rose to become deputy director of the palace secretariat and, in this role, served as one of the emperor's principal counsellors and de facto chief ministers. An astute politician and erudite intellectual, Yu was nevertheless faulted by traditional historians for personal corruption, indulging Emperor Yang's autocratic tendencies, and mismanaging the imperial response to agrarian rebellions. Amid the gradual collapse of imperial authority, Yu and his family accompanied Emperor Yang in his retreat to Jiangdu. After Emperor Yang was killed in a coup d'état led by the general Yuwen Huaji in 618, Yu and his sons were executed.

== During the Chen dynasty ==
Yu Shiji was born before 558, when his younger brother Yu Shinan was born (Note: It is likely that Yu Shiji was much older than Yu Shinan as their father was about 55 when the latter was born.). Their father Yu Li (虞荔; 503 - 561) was a mid-level official of the Chen dynasty. Yu Shiji was considered knowledgeable and quiet in his youth, and was particularly good at calligraphy. The high-level officials Kong Huan (孔奐) and Xu Ling (徐陵) were both impressed with him, and Xu was so impressed that he compared Yu Shiji to Pan Jun and Lu Xun, and gave a niece to him in marriage. He initially served on the staff of Chen Shuyin (陳叔英) the Prince of Jian'an—the brother to Chen's last emperor Chen Shubao, and later served in the imperial administration as well. Once, Chen Shubao (Note: The reference in the Book of Sui did not actually specify which emperor of Chen was involved, but based on context, it was more likely to be Chen Shubao rather than his father Emperor Xuan.) was impressed with an essay Yu wrote on historical uses of the military and he awarded Yu a horse.

== During Emperor Wen's reign ==
In 589, Chen was conquered by the Sui dynasty, and Yu subsequently served in Sui's legislative bureau (內史省, Neishi Sheng) as a low-level official during the reign of Emperor Wen. Despite his position, however, he had little money, and he was forced to take retainers in writing calligraphy in order to support his mother. He once wrote a poem about his poverty, and the poem became famous and praised for its beauty. Eventually, he was promoted within the legislative bureau.

== During Emperor Yang's reign ==
In 604, Emperor Wen died and was succeeded by his son Emperor Yang. Emperor Yang was impressed with Yu's talent and began to promote him, particularly after Liu Guyan (柳顧言), the head of the Palace Library, endorsed Yu, and Yu was promoted to be the deputy head of the legislative bureau. His mother soon died, however, and he left imperial service to serve a mourning period, although Emperor Yang soon recalled him to governmental service. Emperor Yang made him, along with Niu Hong (牛弘), Su Wei, Yuwen Shu, Zhang Jin (張瑾), Pei Yun (裴蘊), and Pei Ju in charge of selecting and promoting officials, and they were known as the "seven nobles of officialdom." However, it was said that the actual selective powers were in Yu's hands, and that Yu became exceedingly corrupt, making recommendations based on the amount of bribes that he received. It was further said that he was so enamored with his second wife Lady Sun that he spent much of his gains in impressing and decorating her. He thus became despised by the people, particularly in comparison to his brother Yu Shinan, who was praised for his integrity. It was said that a major reason why Emperor Yang trusted Yu greatly was that Yu was good at figuring out what he intended and following it, notwithstanding any adverse impact such decisions might have on the government or the populace. He appeared to suffer no adverse consequences from his son Yu Zirou (虞子柔)'s joining the rebellion of Yang Xuangan in 613, and even Yu Zirou was not executed after Emperor Yang's forces defeated Yang Xuangan.

In the fall of 615, while Emperor Yang was touring the northern frontier of his empire, the Eastern Turkish (Tujue) leader Shibi Khan launched a surprise attack against Yanmen Commandery. His wife, the Chinese princess Yicheng, sent her kinsman the emperor a secret warning about the attack but the emperor was only able to reach the commandery seat at present-day Daixian in Shanxi. The khan then put the town under siege on September 11. (Note: guiyou day of the 8th month of the 11th year of the Da'ye era (大業十一年八月癸酉)) Emperor Yang was frightened, but Yu suggested that he try to restore the morale by announcing publicly that he was terminating the campaigns against Goguryeo and would award the soldiers greatly if they could lift the siege. Following his brother-in-law Xiao Yu's advice, however, the emperor also sought further help from Princess Yicheng, who sent her husband a false report of a northern attack on the khaganate. Between this report and others informing him of the arrival of Chinese reinforcements, Shibi Khan lifted the siege and returned home. With credit for his salvation murky, the emperor followed the advice of Su Wei and others to renege on most of his extravagant promises of reward; he also returned to Luoyang and began planning another expedition against Goguryeo, causing still more disaffection throughout the army. Resentment among the people was also aimed at Yu.

In 616, because much of Sui territory had become engulfed in agrarian rebellions, Yu suggested that an army be stationed at Luokou Storage (洛口倉, near the eastern capital Luoyang) to protect it from pillagers, and Emperor Yang rebuked him for being fearful. From that point on, Yu no longer suggested any tactics against the rebels, figuring out that Emperor Yang did not want to hear about the rebels. When the general Yang Yichen was able to defeat several major rebels north of the Yellow River and forced many rebels to surrender, Emperor Yang was surprised at how many rebels surrendered—and Yu responded by stating, falsely, that Yang Yichen had been able to get all of them to surrender and that Emperor Yang no longer needed to worry. Subsequently, at Yu's instigation, probably because both Yu and Emperor Yang were apprehensive of Yang Yichen's responsibilities and capability, Yang Yichen's forces were disbanded, and Yang Yichen himself was recalled to the imperial government around the new year 617 and ostensibly promoted but was detached from the army. Once Yang Yichen's campaigns terminated, the rebellions went unchecked.

Later in 617, against the advice of a number of officials, Emperor Yang left Luoyang to go to Jiangdu (江都, in modern Yangzhou, Jiangsu). After Emperor Yang left Luoyang, the rebels became particularly encouraged, and one of the major rebels, Li Mi, seized not only Luokou Storage but also Huiluo Storage (回洛倉), making his army well-supplied while depriving the Sui forces at Luoyang of food supplies. Emperor Yang's grandson Yang Tong the Prince of Yue, left in charge of Luoyang, sent his staff member Yuan Shanda (元善達) to Jiangdu to request help from Emperor Yang, and Yuan tearfully reported to Emperor Yang, "Li Mi has several million men. He has put Luoyang under siege and occupied Luokou Storage, making Luoyang lack food. If Your Imperial Majesty shall return quickly, his band of men will disband; otherwise, the eastern capital will surely fall." Emperor Yang was touched, but Yu responded, "The Prince of Yue is young and easy to deceive. If the bandits are really that strong, how could Yuan Shanda get here?" Emperor Yang thus became convinced that Yuan was deceiving him and ordered him to go to a rebel-occupied commandery to collect food supplies, and Yuan was killed by the rebels. Thereafter, few officials dared to speak about the rebels.

By spring 618, Emperor Yang, aware that rebels had occupied much of the northern empire, no longer had any intent to return to the north, wishing to take refuge at Danyang (丹楊, in modern Nanjing, Jiangsu), south of the Yangtze River. Yu endorsed the plan, and despite opposition by the general Li Cai (李才), Emperor Yang began building a palace at Danyang in anticipation of moving the capital there. The elite Xiaoguo Army, then with Emperor Yang at Jiangdu, was protecting Emperor Yang, but their ranks, stricken with homesickness, was suffering many defections. Several of its commanders believed that they would be punished, and they decided to carry out a coup, with Yuwen Shu's son Yuwen Huaji the Duke of Xu as their leader. The general Zhang Huishao (張惠紹) heard about the plot and reported it to Pei Yun, and Pei and Zhang planned to issue a false edict to have Yuwen Huaji arrested and then mobilize the troops against the coup leaders. They report to Yu, and Yu, believing that the report was false, refused to support the plan. The coup soon went into action, and the coup leaders killed Emperor Yang, and then killed many of his relatives and high-level officials. Yu was one that they were ready to execute. Yu's sons Yu Xi (虞熙), Yu Rou, and Yu Hui (虞晦) all offered to die before their father, and were executed first. Yu Shi'nan offered to die instead of Yu Shiji, but the coup leaders did not accept the offer and executed Yu Shiji.

== See also ==
- Fall of Sui
