= Gao Kaidao =

Chinese agrarian rebel leader (died 624)

Yan Wang (燕王)
Family name:	Gao (高, gāo)
Given name:	Kaidao (開道, kāi dào)
Posthumous name:	None

Gao Kaidao (Chinese: 高開道; died 624), at one point known as Li Kaidao (李開道), was an agrarian rebel leader who rose against the Sui dynasty at the end of Emperor Yang's reign. He occupied the region centering Huairong (懷戎, in modern Zhangjiakou, Hebei) and claimed the title of Prince of Yan, in alliance with the Eastern Turkic Khaganate (Dong Tujue). In 620, he briefly submitted to Emperor Gaozu of Tang and was bestowed the imperial surname of Li, but in 621 he rebelled against Tang and reasserted independence. In 624, his general Zhang Jinshu (張金樹) started a coup and he, realizing that the coup was about to succeed, committed suicide.

== Initial uprising ==
Little is known about Gao Kaidao's background, and his birth year is not known. He was from Cang Province (滄州, roughly modern Cangzhou, Hebei). In his youth, he supported himself by boiling sea water to yield salt. He was said to be strong and fast on his horse.

In or before 616, Gao joined the rebel leader Ge Qian (格謙). Ge was killed by the Sui general Yang Yichen in 616, and Gao gathered the remainder of Ge's troops. He led them in pillaging the modern northern Hebei.

In 617, Gao put Beiping (北平, in modern Qinhuangdao, Hebei) under siege—a siege that lasted for more than a year. Around the new year 619, the Sui general Li Jing (李景), who defended the city, could not defend the city anymore, and abandoned it when another Sui general, Deng Gao (鄧暠), came to his aid. Gao Kaidao was then able to capture Beiping, and he then also captured Yuyang (漁陽, in modern Tianjin). He declared himself the Prince of Yan and changed the era name to show independence from Sui. He set his capital at Yuyang.

Meanwhile, there was another major rebel leader nearby—Gao Tansheng (高曇晟), a Buddhist monk who had seized Huairong and claimed the title of Dacheng Emperor (i.e., Emperor of Mahayana). Gao Tansheng sent messengers to persuade Gao Kaidao to submit to him, and Gao Kaidao agreed. Gao Tansheng created him the Prince of Qi, but several months later, Gao Kaidao assassinated Gao Tansheng, taking over Gao Tansheng's troops and making Huairong his capital. Both he and another rebel leader, Dou Jiande, tried to get Luo Yi, who then occupied You Prefecture (幽州, roughly modern Beijing), to submit, but Luo refused, submitting instead to the Tang dynasty.

== Brief submission to Tang and subsequent rebellion against Tang ==
Map of the situation in northern China during the transition from the Sui to the Tang, with the main contenders for the throne and the main military operations.

In summer 620, Dou put Luo, who had by now been bestowed the Tang imperial surname Li and was known as Li Yi, under siege. Li Yi sought aid from Gao, who personally led two thousand cavalry soldiers to aid Li Yi, causing Dou to withdraw. Gao thereafter sought to submit to Tang, through Li Yi. In winter 620, Emperor Gaozu of Tang commissioned Gao as the commandant at Wei Prefecture (蔚州, roughly modern Zhangjiakou) and bestowed the imperial surname of Li on him as well, creating him the Prince of Beiping. It was around this time that an incident that showed both Gao's fortitude and cruelty was recorded, as an arrowhead was stuck in Gao's face. When he asked a surgeon to remove it, the surgeon replied, "The arrowhead was in too deep. I cannot remove it." Gao, in anger, executed the surgeon. He then asked another surgeon, who responded, "I can remove it, but it will be very painful." Gao again, in anger, executed to the surgeon. He then asked a third surgeon, who responded, "No problem." The surgeon thereafter operated on him, drilling into his bone and cracking it open, to remove the arrowhead. It was said that during the operation, Gao continued feasting and had singing and dancing girls entertain him.

In winter 621, Li Yi's You Prefecture was suffering from a famine. Gao agreed to supply You Prefecture with food, and when Li Yi sent the weaker of his men to Wei Province to save them from the famine, Gao treated them well. Li Yi was pleased, and he sent three thousand men with several hundred wagons and over 1,000 horses and donkeys to Wei Prefecture to transport food. Gao, however, turned against Li Yi and kept all of them, breaking off the relations with Li Yi and the Tang dynasty. He allied himself with the Eastern Turks to the north and Liu Heita to the south. He attacked Yi Prefecture (易州, part of modern Baoding, Hebei) but could not capture it. He, however, carried out pillaging raids against the prefectures under Li Yi's and other Tang generals' controls. In spring 623, he joined the Eastern Turks' Jiali Khan and Yuan Junzhang (苑君璋), a general formally under Liu Wuzhou the Dingyang Khan, in attacking the Tang fortress at the seat of Yanmen County (present-day Daixian, Shanxi), but could not capture it. He continued to raid Tang prefectures for several years, often in conjunction with the Turks or Xi. In 623, he assisted Jiali Khan in sieging Mayi (present-day Shuozhou, Shanxi) and capturing it, although the khan soon returned Mayi to the Tang.

== Death ==
By spring 624, Tang had largely wiped out the competitors for rule of China. Gao, fearful that he would be targeted next, considered surrendering, but decided not to do so because he had turned against Tang previously and because the Eastern Turks supported him. His men, however, were largely from territory now ruled by Tang, and they missed their homeland. Gao, fearing that the men might turn against him, selected several hundred men and formally adopted them as sons, having them guard his mansion, putting his confidant Zhang Jinshu (張金樹) in charge of the guards.

Meanwhile, Liu Heita had been defeated and killed by Tang in 623, and his general Zhang Junli (張君立) fled to Gao. Zhang Junli and Zhang Jinshu subsequently plotted against Gao. One night, Zhang Jinshu had his coconspirators secretly cut the strings on the guards' bows and hide their swords and spears. After people were asleep, Zhang Jinshu and his coconspirators attacked Gao's mansion. When the guards realized that their weapons were useless or missing, they surrendered. Gao, realizing that his situation was hopeless, nevertheless put on his armor and armed himself with weapons, sitting in his great hall. He held a feast with his princess wife and concubines and ordered the music be played. The conspirators, fearing his ferocity, did not dare to approach. When dawn came, Gao committed suicide by hanging, and his wife, concubines, and sons all committed suicide as well. Zhang Jinshu then massacred Gao's adopted sons and Zhang Junli, surrendering to Tang.

== Era names ==
- Shixing (始興 shǐ xīng) 618-624

Preceded by Emperor Yang of Sui	Ruler of China (Northern Hebei); 618–624	Succeeded by Emperor Gaozu of Tang
