= Luo Yi =

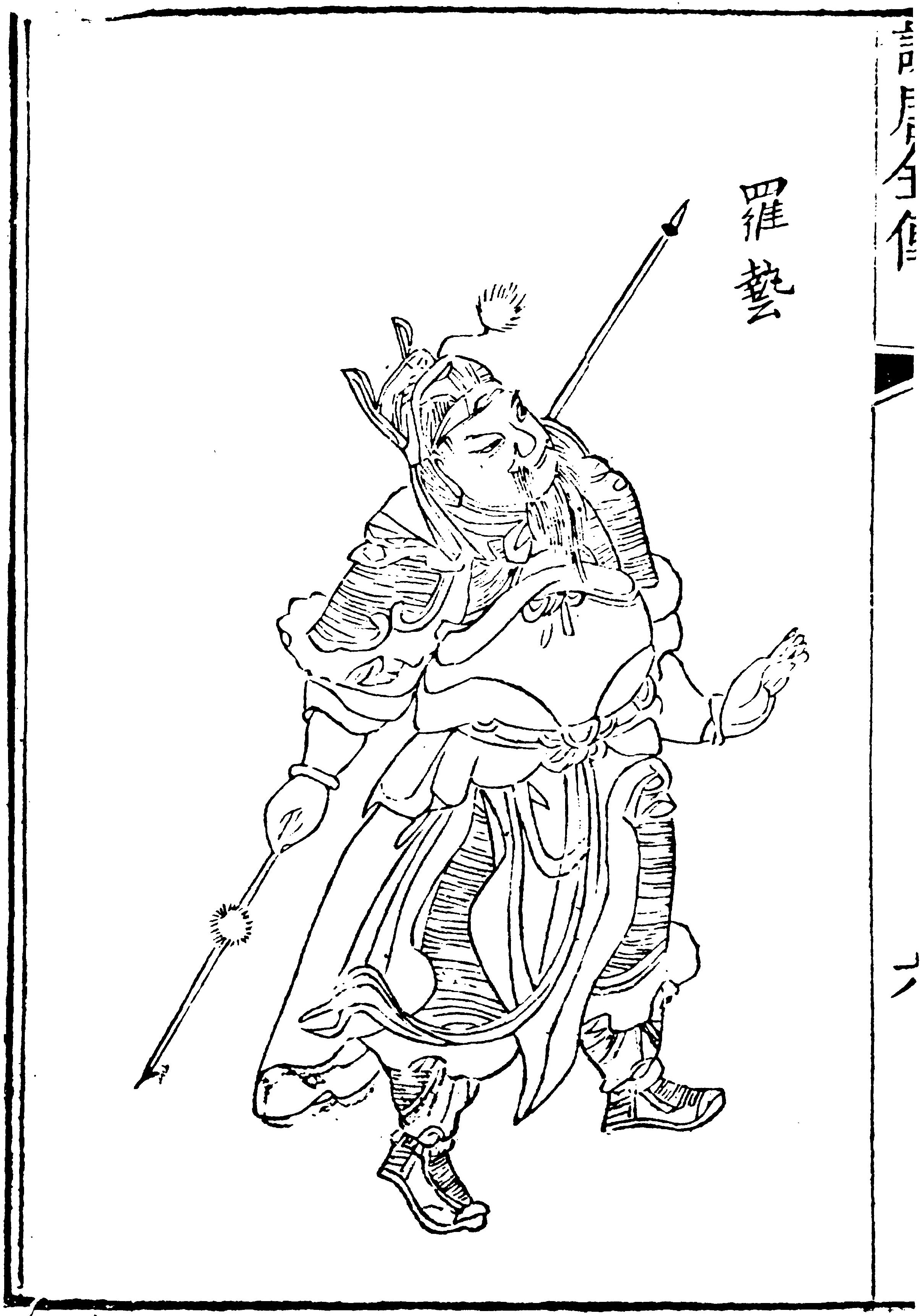
Luo Yi

Luo Yi (Chinese: 羅藝) (died 627), known during service to the Tang dynasty as Li Yi (李藝), courtesy name Ziyan (子延) or Ziting (子廷), (Note: The Old Book of Tang, vol. 56, gives Luo Yi's courtesy name as Ziyan, but the New Book of Tang, vol. 92, gives his courtesy name as Ziting.) was a Sui dynasty official who rose against the rule of Emperor Yang of Sui and occupied the modern Beijing region. He subsequently submitted to Emperor Gaozu of Tang and was created the Prince of Yan and granted the imperial surname of Li. He subsequently, in the struggle between Emperor Gaozu's sons Li Jiancheng the Crown Prince and Li Shimin the Prince of Qin, joined Li Jiancheng's faction. After Li Shimin killed Li Jiancheng in 626 and forced Emperor Gaozu to yield the throne to him (as Emperor Taizong), Li Yi was fearful, and he rebelled against Emperor Taizong in 627. He was soon defeated and killed.

== Initial uprising ==
Luo Yi's clan was originally from Xiangyang (襄陽, in modern Xiangfan, Hubei), but moved from there to the Sui capital Chang'an. Luo Yi's father Luo Rong (羅榮) was a minor general during Sui. Luo Yi was said to be intelligent, self-confident, and capable in battle, but unkind. Due to his contributions on the battlefield, by the latter part of the reign of Emperor Yang of Sui, Luo was a key army officer at Beiping (北平, in modern Qinhuangdao, Hebei), under the command of the general Li Jing (李景). Luo's was said to be strict in his discipline of soldiers, but he himself was arrogant even toward Li. Li often rebuked him, and he therefore resented Li.

By 616, nearby Zhuo Commandery (涿郡, roughly modern Beijing) was constantly under pillaging attacks by agrarian rebels, as Emperor Yang had stored much military supplies and placed many soldiers at Zhuo Commandery for his campaigns against Goguryeo, and nearby Linshuo Palace (臨朔宮) contained much imperial treasure. The military officers in charge of defending the city, Zhao Shizhu (趙什住), Helan Yi (賀蘭誼), and Jin Wenyan (晉文衍) were all unable to stop the pillaging raids, but Luo often battled these agrarian rebels and prevailed, earning him greater reputation than the others. Zhao, who was in overall command, greatly suspected Luo. Luo, who considered rebelling against Sui rule, incited his soldiers by telling them:

"We attack the bandits and often prevailed. However, even though the food supplies are stacked like mountains inside the city, the commander [i.e., Zhao] is unwilling to distribute them to the hungry people. How can the officers and soldiers be encouraged by this?"

After Luo returned from an attack on the rebels, he arrested the commandery secretary general, and Zhao, in fear, submitted to him. Luo distributed the stored wealth and food to the soldiers and the people and executed several officials who were not willing to follow his orders. A number of Sui cities, including as far as Liucheng (柳城, in modern Zhaoyang, Liaoning) and Huaiyuan (懷遠, in modern Shenyang, Liaoning), submitted to him. He claimed for himself the office of commandant at Youzhou (幽州, i.e., Zhuo Commandery), using an office title that was often used during the reign of Emperor Yang's father Emperor Wen but had been abolished by Emperor Yang.

== Submission to Tang ==
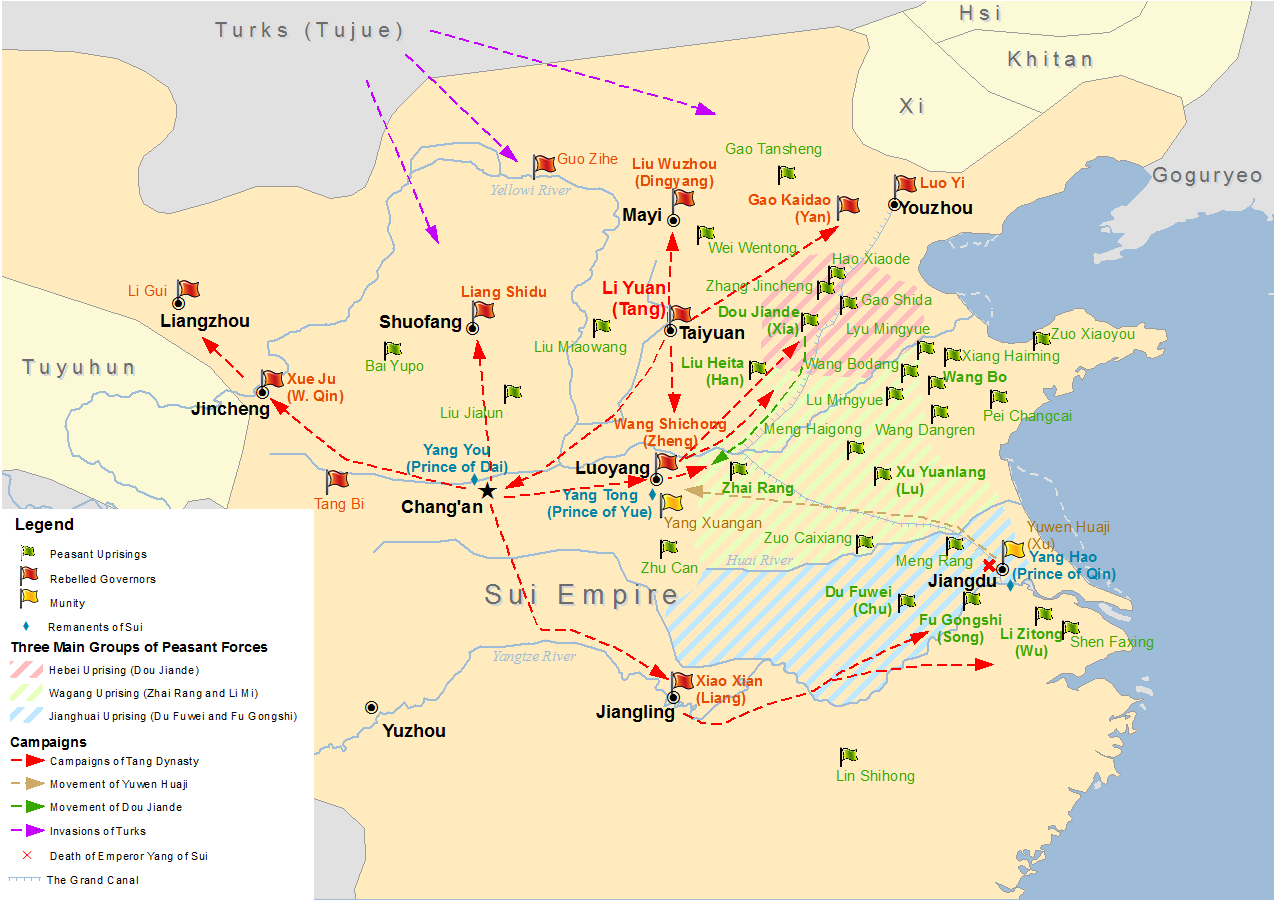
Map showing major uprisings and rebellions in the last years of the Sui dynasty. Luo Yi controls the Youzhou region which is close to modern Beijing.

In spring 618, Emperor Yang, while at Jiangdu (江都, in modern Yangzhou, Jiangsu), was killed in a coup led by the general Yuwen Huaji, who declared Emperor Yang's nephew Yang Hao emperor. Yuwen sent messengers to Luo Yi, trying to persuade him to submit. Luo responded, "I am still a Sui subject." He executed Yuwen's messengers and declared a mourning period for Emperor Yang—albeit only for three days, not for the Confucian traditional three years or the shortened 36-day period as modified by Emperor Wen of Han. Subsequently, the rebel leaders Dou Jiande the Prince of Xia and Gao Kaidao both sent messengers to try to get him to submit, but Luo, viewing Dou and Gao as bandits, refused. Rather, hearing that the Sui general Li Yuan had taken the throne at Chang'an and established the Tang dynasty (as its Emperor Gaozu), Luo decided to submit to him, through the Tang general Zhang Daoyuan (張道源). Around the new year 619, Emperor Gaozu commissioned Luo as the commandant at Youzhou. He subsequently repelled an attack from Dou.

In winter 619, Emperor Gaozu created Luo the Prince of Yan Commandery and bestowed the imperial surname of Li on him, and he thereafter became known as Li Yi. Around the same time, he repelled another Dou attack. Dou attacked again in summer 620, and he again repelled the attack, with Gao's aid. Gao thereafter submitted to Tang as well, through him.

In 621, Emperor Gaozu's son Li Shimin the Prince of Qin (the eventual Emperor Taizong) captured Dou, and Emperor Gaozu executed Dou. For a short duration, Dou's domain submitted to Tang, but subsequently Dou's generals rose against Tang, led by Liu Heita. Emperor Gaozu sent a number of generals against Liu and ordered Li Yi to attack Liu from the north. Liu, however, was successful in defeating all Tang generals sent against him, including Li Yi, and regaining all of Dou's territory. Meanwhile, Youzhou was suffering from a famine. Gao agreed to supply Youzhou with food, and when Li Yi sent the weaker of his men to Wei Province to save them from the famine, Gao treated them well. Li Yi was pleased, and he sent three thousand men with several hundred wagons and over 1,000 horses and donkeys to Wei Prefecture to transport food. Gao, however, turned against Li Yi and kept all of them, breaking off the relations with Li Yi and the Tang dynasty. He allied himself with Eastern Tujue to the north and Liu to the south.

In 622, with Li Shimin attacking Liu, Li Yi led his forces to join Li Shimin to attack Liu's capital at Ming Prefecture (洺州, in modern Handan, Hebei). After the armies stalemated for several months, Li Shimin defeated Liu by using the waters of the nearby Ming River to drown Liu's army, forcing Liu to flee to Eastern Tujue. Li Yi returned to his post at Youzhou. Late that year, however, Liu returned with Eastern Tujue aid, and Li Yi was unable to repel him, although Liu was subsequently defeated by Li Shimin's brother Li Jiancheng the Crown Prince and killed in early 623.

In spring 623 as well, Li Yi requested that he leave his post and serve at the capital Chang'an instead. He was made a general in the imperial army.

== Involvement in the struggle between Li Jiancheng and Li Shimin ==
It appeared that soon after arriving in the capital, Li Yi became a close associate to Li Jiancheng, who was then locked in a struggle with Li Shimin for power, as while Li Jiancheng was older and legally Emperor Gaozu's successor, Li Shimin was more famous, had contributed more to Tang's establishment, and enjoyed greater loyalty from the army. On one occasion, when Li Shimin sent messengers to Li Yi, Li Yi had them bound and battered, drawing Emperor Gaozu's ire. Emperor Gaozu briefly arrested Li Yi, but soon released and restored him. On another occasion in 624, Li Jiancheng, against Emperor Gaozu's regulations, requisitioned the elite soldiers from under Li Yi's command to augment his own guards, and when this was discovered, Emperor Gaozu rebuked Li Jiancheng and exiled his guard commander Keda Zhi (可達志).

In summer 625, with Tang's capital region Guanzhong being under constant raids by Eastern Tujue, Emperor Gaozu repositioned a number of generals to try to defend against these raids, and as part of the movement, forces under Li Yi's command were placed at Huating (華亭, in modern Pingliang, Gansu) and Tanzheng Canyon (彈箏峽, in modern Guyuan, Ningxia).

In summer 626, with Eastern Tujue attacking again, Emperor Gaozu commissioned another son, Li Yuanji the Prince of Qi, who was part of Li Jiancheng's faction, to lead troops against Eastern Tujue, and Li Yi was assigned to be under Li Yuanji's command. However, at this time, Li Shimin, apparently fearful that Li Jiancheng and Li Yuanji were about to kill him, acted first, ambushing Li Jiancheng and Li Yuanji and killing them at the Incident at Xuanwu Gate, and then effectively forced Emperor Gaozu to first create him crown prince, and then two months later yield the throne to him (as Emperor Taizong).

== Death ==
Emperor Taizong declared a general pardon of Li Jiancheng's and Li Yuanji's staff members and incorporated a number of Li Jiancheng's advisors into his own administration. Still, having had conflicts with Li Shimin before, Li Yi was fearful. Meanwhile, the witch Li Wujie (李五戒) was a close associate with Li Yi's wife Princess Meng, informing her that both she and Li Yi were beginning to show signs of great glory. Both Li Wujie and Meng then persuaded him to rebel.

Li Yi agreed, and, in spring 627, Li Yi pretended to receive a secret order from Emperor Taizong to return to Chang'an from his then-defense post at Yi Prefecture (宜州, in modern Tongchuan, Shaanxi). He seized Zhao Cihao (趙慈皓) the secretary general of Bin Prefecture (豳州, in modern Xianyang, Shaanxi) and occupied Bin. Emperor Taizong sent his brother-in-law Zhangsun Wuji against Li Yi, but even before Zhangsun's arrival, Zhao's associate Yang Ji (楊岌) attacked Li Yi, whose forces collapsed. Li Yi tried to flee to Eastern Tujue, but when he arrived at Wushi (烏氏, in modern Pingliang), his associates assassinated him and cut off his head to be delivered to Chang'an. Emperor Taizong had his head hung in the streets and changed his name back to Luo, excising him from the imperial clan rolls. His wife Princess Meng, Li Wujie, and his brother Luo Shou (羅壽) were all executed.

== In popular culture ==
In May 2020, Luo Yi was also released as a playable mage hero in Mobile Legends: Bang Bang based on the Chinese culture of the emperor.

== Bibliography ==
- Old Book of Tang, vol. 56.
- New Book of Tang, vol. 92.
- Zizhi Tongjian, vols. 183, 186, 187, 188, 189, 190, 191, 192.
