= Xu Yuanlang =

Lu Wang (魯王)
Family name:	Xu (徐, xú)
Given name:	Yuanlang (圓朗, yuán lǎng)
Posthumous name:	None

Xu Yuanlang (徐圓朗) (died 26 March 623) was an agrarian rebel leader who rose against the rule of the Chinese Sui dynasty late in the reign of Emperor Yang of Sui. After doing so, he did not initially claim any royal title, instead successively submitting nominally to Li Mi the Duke of Wei, Emperor Yang's grandson Yang Tong, Dou Jiande the Prince of Xia, and the Tang dynasty. After Dou was defeated and killed by Tang in 621, Xu briefly re-submitted to Tang, but rose again later that year when Dou's general Liu Heita the Prince of Handong rose against Tang, allying himself with Liu. He claimed the title of Prince of Lu. Tang forces defeated both Liu and Xu in 622, and Xu was killed in flight in 623, ending Xu's state of Lu.

== Initial uprising ==
Nothing is known about Xu Yuanlang's background other than that he was from Yan Province (兗州, roughly modern Jining, Shandong). He rose against the Sui dynasty in or before spring 617, and after he captured Dongping (東平, in modern Heze, Shandong), he expanded his territory, stretching from Dongping to Langye (琅邪, in modern Linyi, Shandong), and had more than 20,000 men.

== Vacillating submissions ==
In spring 618, after another major rebel leader, Li Mi the Duke of Wei, achieved a great victory over the Sui general Wang Shichong and approached the Sui eastern capital Luoyang, Xu Yuanlang, along with several other key rebel leaders, nominally submitted to him and requested that he take imperial title, but Li declined. After Wang defeated Li in 619, Xu submitted to the Sui emperor Yang Tong, then at Luoyang, although he also offered submission to Emperor Gaozu of Tang and was created the Duke of Lu. After Wang had Yang Tong yield the throne to him later that year, ending Sui and establishing a new state of Zheng, Xu also nominally submitted to Zheng. In winter 619, after another rebel leader, Dou Jiande the Prince of Xia, conquered the Tang territory north of the Yellow River, Xu submitted to Xia. In 621, when Zheng was under attack by the Tang general Li Shimin (the eventual Emperor Taizong), Dou requisitioned troops from Xu to aid Wang. Later that year, Dou was defeated and captured by Li Shimin, and Wang also surrendered to Li Shimin. Xu then submitted to Tang as well and was made the commandant of Yan Prefecture and again created the Duke of Lu.

== Resistance against Tang and death ==
Later in 621, Dou's general Liu Heita, supported by a group of Dou Jiande's supporters angry that Tang had executed Dou Jiande (even though he had previously treated the Tang prince Li Shentong (李神通) and the Princess Tong'an (Emperor Gaozu's sister) with kindness when he captured them), rose against Tang rule, and quickly captured most of Dou's former territory. In doing so, he was in communication with Xu, and Xu also rose, capturing the Tang general Sheng Yanshi (盛彥師) and receiving support from eight prefectures. He ordered Sheng to write a letter to Sheng's brother, who was the county magistrate of Yucheng (虞城, in modern Shangqiu, Henan), to get Sheng's brother to surrender, but Sheng instead wrote a letter that told his brother to be faithful and not betray Tang. Xu, after seeing the letter, laughed and said, "General Sheng has integrity and honor, and I shall not kill him." Liu gave Xu a general title, and in winter 621, Xu claimed the title of Prince of Lu as well.

During the next year, various people in the locale vacillated in their allegiance to Xu's Lu state and Tang. In summer 622, after Li Shimin defeated Liu, temporarily forcing Liu to flee to Eastern Tujue, Xu panicked and was not sure what to do. Under the suggestion of his subordinate Liu Fuli (劉復禮), he initially considered welcoming fellow rebel leader Liu Shiche (劉世徹), who had an honored reputation, to be his leader, but once LIu Shiche arrived, Xu, reminded that Zhai Rang had initially supported Li Mi but was ultimately killed by Li Mi, refused to support Liu Shiche and made him a general instead. Later on, suspicious of Liu Shiche, he had Liu Shiche executed. However, under attacks by Li Shimin and Li Shentong, Xu's territory continued to shrink. Li Shimin then returned to the Tang capital Chang'an, but left Li Shentong, Li Shiji, and Ren Gui (任瓌) in the region to continue to attack Xu.

By spring 623, Tang forces were putting Xu's capital at Yan under siege, and Xu's soldiers were surrendering in droves. Xu, desperate, fought out of the city and fled with only several guards. He was soon killed by men out in the country. His territory was taken by Tang.

Preceded by Emperor Yang of Sui	Ruler of China (Shandong); 617–623	Succeeded by Emperor Gaozu of Tang
