= Yuwen Shu =

Chinese Sui dynasty military general and politician (died 616)

Yuwen Shu (Chinese: 宇文述; died 20 November 616), courtesy name Botong (伯通), formally Duke Gong of Xu (許恭公), was a Chinese military general and politician of the Sui dynasty. He was a confidant of Emperor Yang (Yang Guang) and was instrumental in Yang Guang's displacement of his brother Yang Yong as crown prince; therefore, after Yang Guang became emperor, Yuwen Shu became exceedingly powerful and was one of two generals who spearheaded Yangdi's efforts in the Goguryeo-Sui Wars. His son Yuwen Huaji later led a coup against Emperor Yang in 618 and, after killing Emperor Yang, briefly claimed imperial title in 619 and founded the state of Xu, but was soon captured and killed. Another son of Yuwen Shu, Yuwen Shiji, however, was a friend of the Tang dynasty's founder Li Yuan (Emperor Gaozu), and after Li Yuan established Tang remained an influential official.

== Background ==
Yuwen Shu's ancestors were originally named Poyetou (破野頭) (Note: That Yuwen Shu's ancestors served under and were not of the same origin as Northern Zhou's imperial Yuwen clan was recorded in history as first asserted by Li Mi, when Li was fighting against Yuwen Shu's son Yuwen Huaji. This claim was later reported as true by the Book of Sui, but not by the History of Northern Dynasties. The circumstantial evidence as to this assertion was mixed, as Emperor Wen of Sui slaughtered large numbers of members of the Yuwen clan, but did not kill Yuwen Shu or any member of his immediate family, but on the other hand, Northern Zhou largely reserved the post of minister of imperial clan affairs to actual members of the imperial clan, and so the fact that Yuwen Shu's father Yuwen Sheng was the minister of imperial clan affairs may indicate that he was indeed from the imperial clan. It might be noted that the lead editor of the Book of Sui, the Tang dynasty official Wei Zheng, was initially a follower of Li Mi.) and were ethnically Xianbei. As they became followers of the Yuwen branch of the Xianbei, their names were named to Yuwen. His great-great-grandfather Yuwen Juyudun (宇文侰與敦), great-grandfather Yuwen Changshou (宇文長壽), and grandfather Yuwen Gu (宇文孤) all served under Northern Wei as army officers at Woye Garrison (沃野, in modern Bayan Nur, Inner Mongolia). Yuwen Shu's father Yuwen Sheng (宇文盛) was a general under Northern Zhou and eventually served as the minister of imperial clan affairs, one of the six main ministers under Northern Zhou's six-department governmental structure.

It is not known when Yuwen Shu was born. When he was young, he became known for his skills at riding and archery. Because of his father's achievements, during the reign of Emperor Wu of Northern Zhou, he was made a mid-level governmental official. He was much favored by Emperor Wu's regent Yuwen Hu, and he became a commander of Yuwen Hu's personal guards. After Emperor Wu killed Yuwen Hu and personally took power in 572, he made Yuwen Shu the deputy minister of imperial clan affairs, and eventually, he was created the Duke of Boling, and then the Duke of Puyang.

In 580, after the death of Emperor Wu's son and successor Emperor Xuan, Emperor Xuan's father-in-law Yang Jian seized power as regent, and the general Yuchi Jiong, suspicious of Yang's intentions, rose against him at Xiang Province (相州, roughly modern Handan, Hebei). Yang sent the general Wei Xiaokuan against Yuchi, and Yuwen served under Wei. He defeated Yuchi's general Li Jun (李雋), and later, with other generals, defeated Yuchi's son Yuchi Dun (尉遲惇). Eventually, after Wei was victorious over Yuchi Jiong, forcing Yuchi Jiong to commit suicide, Yuwen's title was promoted to Duke of Bao.

== During Emperor Wen's reign ==
In 581, Yang Jian had Emperor Xuan's young son Emperor Jing yield the throne to him, ending Northern Zhou and starting the Sui dynasty as its Emperor Wen. Yuwen Shu served as a general for Sui. In winter 588, when Emperor Wen launched a major attack on rival Chen dynasty, Yuwen Shu participated in the campaign, and after the generals Han Qinhu (韓擒虎) and Heruo Bi (賀若弼) crossed the Yangtze River to attack the Chen capital Jiankang, Yuwen advanced to the nearby fortress of Shitou to aid Han and Heruo. After Heruo and Han captured Jiankang and the Chen emperor Chen Shubao, the Chen generals Xiao Huan (蕭瓛) and Xiao Yan (蕭巖) were holding out in modern Zhejiang. Yuwen was sent, along with Yan Rong (燕榮), to attack Xiao Huan and Xiao Yan, and he defeated Xiao Huan and forced Xiao Yan to surrender. After the completion of the campaign, in recognition of his contributions, Emperor Wen gave his son Yuwen Huaji a mid-level governmental post, while making Yuwen Shu himself the commandant at An Province (安州, roughly modern Xiaogan, Hubei).

After the campaign against Chen, Emperor Wen's son Yang Guang the Prince of Jin, who was in overall command of the campaign against Chen, became the commandant at Yang Province (揚州, roughly modern Yangzhou, Jiangsu). Yuwen Shu was friendly with Yang Guang, and Yang Guang, whose ambitions included displacing his older brother Yang Yong the Crown Prince as his father's heir, therefore requested in 600 and received Emperor Wen's approval to have Yuwen's command post moved to Shou Province (壽州, roughly modern Lu'an, Anhui), closer to Yang Guang's post. At one point, Yang Guang consulted Yuwen Shu as to how he could displace his brother. Yuwen suggested entering an alliance with the powerful official Yang Su—and forming the relationship with Yang Su through Yang Su's brother and confidant Yang Yue (楊約). Yang Guang therefore gave Yuwen much treasure and had him go to the capital Chang'an to try to meet Yang Yue. Yuwen offered some of the treasures pillaged from Chen to Yang Yue, and then also intentionally lost to Yang Yue when the gambled. After he had become sufficiently familiar to Yang Yue, he revealed to Yang Yue that it was Yang Guang's intent to enter into an alliance with Yang Su—persuading Yang Yue that given that Yang Su did not have a warm relationship with Yang Yong, his family would be in danger if Yang Yong were to succeed Emperor Wen. Yang Yue, in turn, persuaded Yang Su, who subsequently persuaded Emperor Wen and Emperor Wen's wife Empress Dugu that Yang Yong should be deposed. Emperor Wen and Empress Dugu agreed, and in 600 Emperor Wen deposed Yang Yong and replaced him with Yang Guang. Yang Guang made Yuwen Shu a commander of his palace guards and gave his daughter, the Princess Nanyang, to Yuwen Shu's son Yuwen Shiji (宇文士及) in marriage.

In 604, while Emperor Wen was ill, Yuwen Shu was one of the guard commanders that Yang Guang summoned to guard Emperor Wen's vacation palace Renshou Palace (仁壽宮, in modern Baoji, Shaanxi). Emperor Wen soon died—a death that traditional historians, while admitting a lack of direct evidence, generally believed to be a murder ordered by Yang Guang. Yang Guang then took the throne as Emperor Yang, and he put Yang Yong to death.

== During Emperor Yang's reign ==
After Emperor Yang took the throne, Yuwen Shu, as one of his confidants, became more and more powerful, eventually becoming one of the most powerful individuals in the realm; Emperor Yang also elevated his title to Duke of Xu (許國公). In 607, Yuwen, in order to allow Yun Dingxing (雲定興), the father of Yang Yong's favorite concubine Consort Yun, to join Emperor Yang's regime, persuaded Yun that Yang Yong's sons needed to die, and then persuaded Emperor Yang of the same. Emperor Yang poisoned Yang Yong's oldest son (by Consort Yun), Yang Yan (楊儼) the former Prince of Changning, and exiled Yang Yong's other sons, but eventually had them all killed. It was only after the deaths of Yang Yong's sons that Yuwen was able to recommend Yun to Emperor Yang, who made Yun one of his chief engineers.

In 607, while Emperor Yang was conducting a tour of the northern border, he arrived at Yulin Commandery (榆林, roughly modern Yulin, Shaanxi). Yuwen Shu's sons Yuwen Huaji and Yuwen Zhiji (宇文智及), who were mid-level officials in Emperor Yang's government, secretly conducted forbidden trade with Tujue. Emperor Yang was incensed and ordered that they be executed, but at the last minute spared them, formally awarding them to their father as slaves.

In 608, the official Pei Ju persuaded Tiele to attack Tuyuhun, and after Tiele defeated Tuyuhun, Tuyuhun's Bujiabo Khan Murong Fuyun offered to surrender to Sui. Emperor Yang sent his cousin Yang Xiong (楊雄) the Prince of Ande and Yuwen to rendezvous with Murong Fuyun to accept his surrender, but once Yuwen arrived at Linqiang (臨羌, in modern Xining, Qinghai), Murong Fuyun, fearful of the strength of Yuwen's force, changed his mind and fled west, and Yuwen attacked Tuyuhun's trailing people instead, capturing thousands of Tuyuhun's people. Emperor Yang thus established four commanderies over the former Tuyuhun territory.

In 612, Yuwen Shu participated in Emperor Yang's first campaign against Goguryeo. Emperor Yang's main forces put Goguryeo's key northern city Liaodong (遼東, in modern Liaoyang, Liaoning) under siege (although he was ultimately unable to capture it), but sent Yuwen with a branch army to head deep south, across the Yalu River, heading directly toward the Goguryeo capital Pyongyang. However, on the way, his army ran out of food supplies and was forced to withdraw, and as it did, Goguryeo forces gave chase and crushed him. When Emperor Yang retreated as well, he put Yuwen under imprisonment, but still remembering his relationship with Yuwen, did not execute him, but reduced him to commoner rank. However, soon he had Yuwen's title restored.

In 613, Emperor Yang launched his second campaign against Goguryeo—and again, he himself headed for Liaodong while ordering Yuwen and Yang Yichen to head for Pyongyang. In the midst of the campaign, however, news arrived that Yang Su's son Yang Xuangan had rebelled near the eastern capital Luoyang. Emperor Yang was forced to abandon the campaign against Goguryeo, and he sent Yuwen and Qutu Tong (屈突通) ahead of himself, to reinforce the forces near Luoyang against Yang Xuangan. Yuwen, Qutu, and the generals defeated Yang Xuangan, and Yang Xuangan fled west, intending to attack Chang'an. Yuwen, Qutu, Wei Wensheng (衛文昇) and Lai Hu'er (來護兒) gave chase, catching up with Yang Xuangan at Hongnong (弘農, in modern Sanmenxia, Henan) and dealt him a final crushing blow. Yang Xuangan tried to flee further, but knowing that he could not escape, had his brother Yang Jishan (楊積善) kill him. Pursuant to Yuwen's suggestions, Emperor Yang had Yang Jishan and Yang Xuangan's strategist Wei Fusi (韋福嗣) put to death in cruel manner.

In 615, Yuwen was involved in a major massacre of a noble clan. While Yuwen was still Emperor Yang's guard commander when Emperor Yang was crown prince, Li Hun (李渾) the son of the senior noble Li Mu (李穆) the Duke of Shen, who had died in 586, had become angry at his nephew Li Yun (李筠), who had inherited the title of Duke of Shen, and he had Li Yun assassinated, while framing his cousin Li Jutan (李瞿曇) for the murder and had Li Jutan executed. He then bribed Yuwen, his brother-in-law, with a promise that if he were allowed to inherit the ducal title, he would give Yuwen half of the stipend received from the fief. Yuwen persuaded the Crown Prince to in turn persuade Emperor Wen to agree, so Li Hun inherited the title. However, after Li Hun received the title, he only paid the bribe for two years and then stopped. Yuwen, resentful of Li Hun's broken promise, planned his revenge. By 615, there had been rumors throughout Sui territory that the next emperor would be named Li. Emperor Yang therefore particularly became suspicious of Li Hun's nephew Li Min (李敏), the husband of his sister Yang Lihua's daughter Yuwen Eying (宇文娥英, who was also the daughter of Northern Zhou's Emperor Xuan, as the Yang Lihua, the Princess Leping, was Emperor Xuan's wife and empress), because Li Min's nickname was "Hong'er" (洪兒), meaning "son of a flood," and Emperor Wen had long ago dreamed that a flood would overflow the capital. Emperor Yang therefore tried to hint to Li Min that he should commit suicide, but Li Min did not. Yuwen Shu then had the official Pei Renji (裴仁基) falsely accuse Li Hun of plotting treason. Emperor Yang put Yuwen Shu in charge of the investigation, and Yuwen Shu manufactured evidence, particularly persuading Yuwen Eying that Emperor Yang would have the Lis executed anyway, and that she should save herself. Yuwen Eying thus wrote a confession implicating both Li Hun and Li Min. Li Hun, Li Min, and 32 of their clansmen were executed, and their other relatives were exiled. Several months later, Yuwen Eying was also poisoned.

In fall 615, Yuwen accompanied Emperor Yang on a tour of the northern frontier. The Eastern Turk leader Shibi Khan took the opportunity to launch a surprise attack against Yanmen Commandery in reprisal against various offenses by the emperor. His Chinese wife, the princess Yicheng, secretly sent a warning of the Turkish plans to Emperor Yang, who took refuge at the commandery seat in present-day Daixian, Shanxi. The Turks began their siege of the town on September 11. Yuwen suggested Emperor Yang select a few thousand elite cavalry soldiers to attempt a break out, but Su Wei and Fan Zigai (樊子蓋) persuaded Emperor Yang not to attempt this. Instead, at the suggestion of his brother-in-law Xiao Yu, the emperor sought more help from Princess Yicheng, who was one of his relatives but—according to Turkish custom—was in charge of managing military affairs at home in her husband's absence. She sent Shibi Khan a false report of a northern attack on the Khaganate; hearing this and learning of Chinese reinforcements on their way to the emperor's relief, the khan abandoned the siege and returned north. Su subsequently suggested to Emperor Yang that he return to Chang'an, but at Yuwen's suggestion, Emperor Yang went to Luoyang instead.

In fall 616, while Emperor Yang was inquiring about the status of agrarian rebellions (by this point, most of Sui territory was in fact engulfed in agrarian rebellions), Yuwen, in order to placate him, informed him that the rebellions had largely been suppressed. Su, however, truthfully informed Emperor Yang that the rebellions were causing major problems for Sui rule. Emperor Yang, not happy about the news, soon considered putting Su to death, but eventually only reduced Su to commoner rank.

Soon thereafter, seeing that Emperor Yang wanted to go back to Jiangdu, the capital of Yang Province, Yuwen formally suggested that he does so, and Emperor Yang agreed. Yuwen followed Emperor Yang there, and became ill at Jiangdu. He died in winter 616. Pursuant to his dying wishes, Emperor Yang pardoned Yuwen Huaji and Yuwen Zhiji, returning them to governmental service.

== See also ==
- Goguryeo-Sui Wars
- Emperor Yang of Sui
- Yuwen Huaji
- Collapse of the Sui
