= Yang Yichen (Sui dynasty) =

Military general during the Sui Dynasty

Yang Yichen (Chinese: 楊義臣; died 617?), né Yuchi Yichen (尉遲義臣), was a general of the Chinese Sui dynasty. During the late reign of Emperor Yang, Yang Yichen was one of the few Sui generals having success against agrarian rebels, but in 616, Emperor Yang, unhappy about Yang Yichen's mounting influences, removed him from his military position, and thereafter the agrarian rebels went unchecked. Yang Yichen died soon afterwards.

== Background ==
Yang Yichen's father Yuchi Chong (尉遲崇) was ethnically Xianbei and a distant relative of the general Yuchi Jiong. Yuchi Chong was a general during Northern Zhou and had his defense post at Mount Heng. At that time, the general Yang Jian was the commandant at nearby Ding Province (定州, roughly near Baoding, Hebei), and Yuchi Chong, believing Yang Jian to have great ambitions, befriended Yang Jian. After Yang Jian seized power as regent in 580, Yuchi Jiong, suspicious of Yang Jian's intentions, rebelled at Xiang Province (相州, roughly modern Handan, Hebei). When Yuchi Chong heard this, as he was a relative of Yuchi Jiong's, he threw himself into jail and begged Yang Jian for forgiveness. Yang Jian pardoned him and ordered him to report to the capital Chang'an to serve as one of Yang Jian's assistants. After Yang Jian seized the throne from Emperor Jing of Northern Zhou in 581, ending Northern Zhou and establishing the Sui dynasty as its Emperor Wen, he created Yuchi Chong the Duke of Qinxing. In 582, Yuchi Chong served under Daxi Zhangru (達奚長儒) in a campaign against Tujue's Shabolüe Khan Ashina Shetu, and while Daxi achieved victory, Yuchi died in the battle.

At the time that Yuchi Chong died, his son Yuchi Yichen was said to be still young. Emperor Wen took Yuchi Yichen into the palace and raised him there, allowing him to inherit his father's titles. After he became a teenager, he served in the palace guard corps, and when Emperor Wen saw him, he was reminded of Yuchi Chong's contributions. He therefore issued an edict giving Yuchi Yichen a moderate amount of wealth, while bestowing the imperial clan surname of Yang on him and conferring him the status of the emperor's grandnephew. Soon afterwards, Emperor Wen made him the governor of Shan Province (陝州, roughly modern Sanmenxia, Henan).

== Service during Emperor Wen's reign ==
Yang Yichen was considered to be honest and careful, with military leadership qualities, and Emperor Wen respected him. In 599, when Tujue's Bujia Khan Ashina Dianjue attacked, Yang Yichen was sent to face Tujue forces, and he repelled them. In 600, in conjunction with Shi Wansui (史萬歲) the Duke of Taiping, he dealt Ashina Dianjue a major defeat. However, later that year, Shi was executed after false accusations by Yang Su, and Yang Yichen was not rewarded for his contributions. Sometime during Emperor Wen's late reign -- the Renshou era (601–604), Yang Yichen was promoted to be the commandant at Shuo Province (朔州, roughly modern Shuozhou, Shanxi).

== During Emperor Yang's reign ==
In 604, Emperor Wen died—a death that traditional historians, while admitting a lack of direct evidence, generally believe to be a murder ordered by his son, Yang Guang the Crown Prince. Yang Guang took the throne as Emperor Yang. Soon afterwards, Emperor Yang's younger brother Yang Liang the Prince of Han rose in rebellion at Bing Province (并州, roughly modern Taiyuan, Shanxi). Yang Liang's general Qiao Zhongkui (喬鍾葵) afterwards put Li Jing (李景), the commandant of Dai Province (代州, roughly modern Xinzhou, Shanxi), who remained loyal to Emperor Yang, under siege. Emperor Yang ordered Yang Yichen to try to lift the siege against Li, and Yang Yichen was successful in defeating Qiao. After Yang Liang was defeated and forced to surrender to Yang Su, Yang Yichen was given material rewards and made the governor of Xiang Province. In 607, Emperor Yang recalled him to be the director of imperial clan affairs, and later the director of husbandry affairs.

In 609, Yang Yichen served as a general in the largely successful campaign against Tuyuhun. In 612, he also served in Emperor Yang's first campaign against Goguryeo, commanding part of the force under Yuwen Shu the Duke of Xu that aimed to penetrate deep into Goguryeo territory, against its capital Pyongyang. While Yang Yichen was personally successful, the campaign was itself a major failure, and as a result, Yang Yichen was removed from his post. However, Emperor Yang soon restored him, and in 613, when Emperor Yang launched a second campaign against Tuyuhun, Yang Yichen again served under Yuwen in an attempt to attack Pyongyang, but when news arrived that Yang Su's son Yang Xuangan had rebelled near the eastern capital Luoyang the campaign was abandoned. Afterwards, with much of Sui territory engulfed in agrarian rebellions, Yang Yichen was sent against the rebel leader Xiang Haiming (向海明), who had claimed imperial title near Chang'an, and Yang Yichen defeated Xiang.

In 616, Emperor Yang sent Yang Yichen against another major rebel leader, Zhang Jincheng (張金稱), and Yang, after lulling Zhang into a sense of security, defeated him and forced him to flee, allowing another Sui general, Yang Shanhui (楊善會), to capture and execute Zhang. Yang Yichen then engaged another major rebel leader, Gao Shida (高士達), who had claimed the title of Duke of Donghai. Around the new year 617, Gao, going against the advice of his subordinate Dou Jiande, engaged Yang Yichen, and Yang Yichen defeated and killed Gao and nearly captured Dou. However, believing that Dou no longer posed a threat, he did not pursue Dou further.

Meanwhile, Emperor Yang and the prime minister Yu Shiji had become suspicious of Yang Yichen after his victories. Emperor Yang summoned Yang Yichen to his then-location at Jiangdu (江都, in modern Yangzhou, Jiangsu) and, ostensibly promoting him, made him the minister of ceremonies, while disbanding his troops. Yang Yichen died soon afterwards.
