= Yuwen Huaji =

Chinese military general, monarch, and politician (died 619)

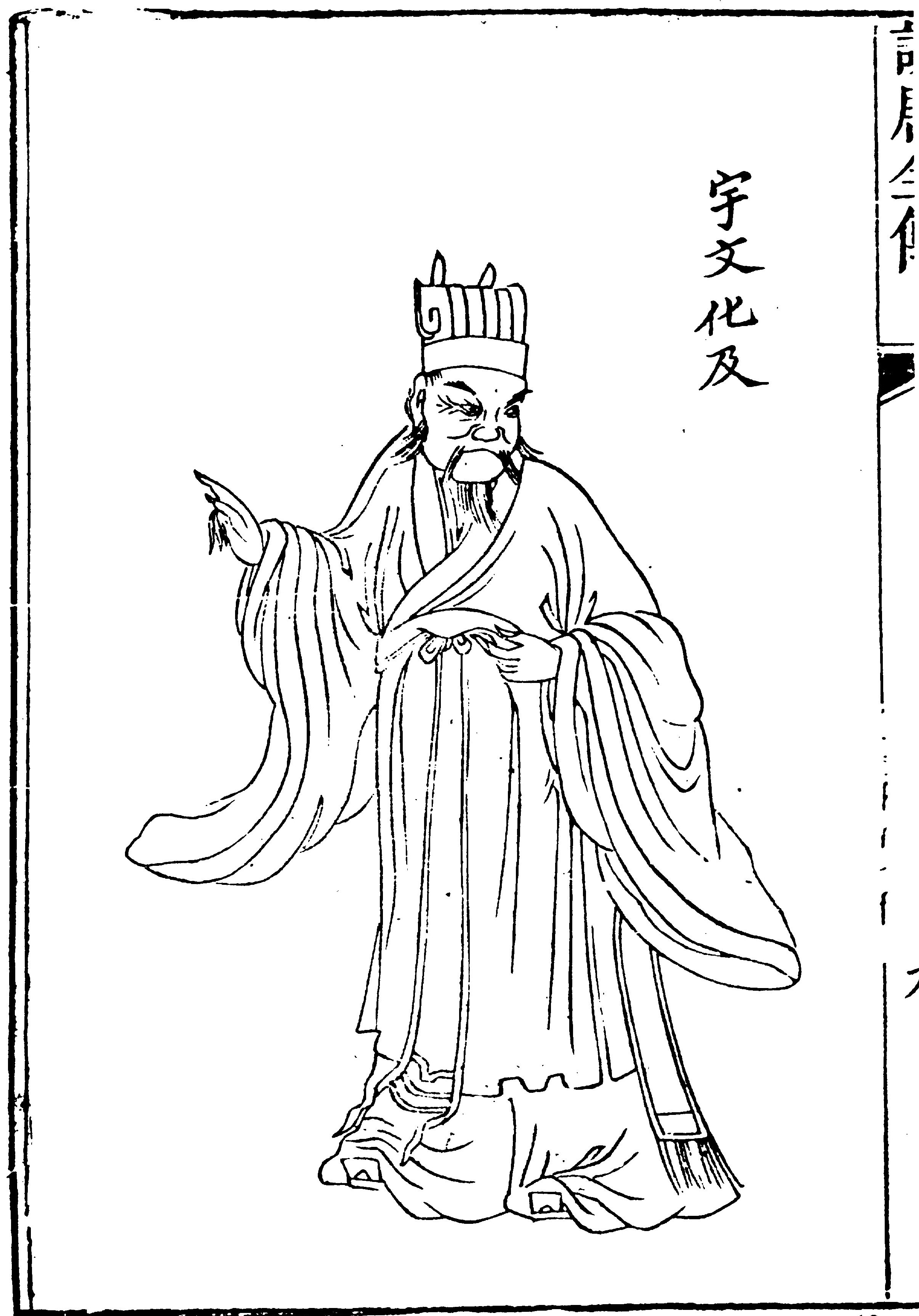
- Reign: 618–619
- Died: March 22, 619
Full name
- Family name: Yǔwén (宇文); Given name: Huàjí (化及)
Era name and dates
- Tiānshòu (天壽): 618–619
- Dynasty: Xǔ (許)
- Occupation: Military general, monarch, politician

Yuwen Huaji (Chinese: 宇文化及; died March 22, 619) was a Chinese military general, monarch, and politician of the Sui dynasty who, in 618, led a coup against and murdered Emperor Yang of Sui. He subsequently declared Emperor Yang's nephew Yang Hao emperor and led Emperor Yang's elite Xiaoguo Army (驍果) north. However, he was then repeatedly defeated by Li Mi, Li Shentong (李神通), and finally Dou Jiande. Believing that his defeat was near and wanting to become emperor before his ultimate defeat, he poisoned Yang Hao and declared himself the emperor of a Xu state. Dou captured him in 619 and killed him.

== Background ==
It is not known when Yuwen Huaji was born. He was the oldest son of the Sui dynasty official Yuwen Shu, a close associate of Yang Guang the Prince of Jin, the son of Sui's founder Emperor Wen, and played a large role in helping Yang Guang displacing his older brother Yang Yong as Emperor Wen's crown prince in 600. Thereafter, Yuwen Huaji served as a guard commander for Yang Guang's palace. It was said that he often rode strong horses at a high speed through the streets of the capital Chang'an, holding a sling and shooting stones from the sling, and several times, he was removed from his post for receiving bribes, but each time Yang Guang persuaded Emperor Wen to restore him, and Yang Guang gave a daughter (the Princess Nanyang) to Yuwen Huaji's brother Yuwen Shiji in marriage.

In 604, Emperor Wen died—a death that traditional historians generally believed to be a murder ordered by Yang Guang, although they admitted a lack of direct evidence—and Yang Guang took the throne as Emperor Yang. He made Yuwen Huaji the deputy minister of husbandry. In 607, Emperor Yang visited Yulin Commandery (榆林, roughly modern Yulin, Shaanxi), and Yuwen Huaji and another brother, Yuwen Zhiji (宇文智及) engaged in forbidden trade with Tujue. Emperor Yang was incensed and ordered that they be executed, but at the last minute spared them, formally awarding them to their father Yuwen Shu as slaves.

In 616, with the northern empire engulfed in agrarian rebellions, Emperor Yang, at Yuwen Shu's suggestion, went to Jiangdu (江都, in modern Yangzhou, Jiangsu). Yuwen Shu and his sons followed Emperor Yang there, and in winter 616, Yuwen Shu died. Emperor Yang, remembering Yuwen Shu's contributions to him, made Yuwen Huaji a general and returned his brother Yuwen Zhiji to office as well. He also allowed Yuwen Huaji to inherit Yuwen Shu's title of Duke of Xu.

== Coup against Emperor Yang ==
Emperor Yang, believing that he was well-protected by the elite Xiaoguo Army and not wanting to return to the turbulent north, considered moving the capital to Danyang (丹陽, in modern Nanjing, Jiangsu). Meanwhile, Xiaoguo soldiers were largely from Guanzhong (i.e., the region around the capital Chang'an), and they missed their home. Once they saw that Emperor Yang was not intending to return, they considered fleeing. Several Xiaoguo officers—the chief among whom were Sima Dekan (司馬德戡), Pei Qiantong (裴虔通), and Yuan Li (元禮)—planned an organized plot to flee. When two of the officers involved in the plot, Yuwen Zhiji's friend Zhao Xinshu (趙行樞) and Yuwen Zhiji's nephew Yang Shilan (楊士覽), discussed the plan with Yuwen Zhiji, Yuwen Zhiji opined that if the Xiaoguo soldiers fled, they would surely be chased down and executed; rather, he suggested that they carry out a coup instead. At the suggestion of Zhao and Xue Shiliang (薛世良), they decided to invite Yuwen Huaji to be their leader. Yuwen Huaji, who was described as cowardly, initially panicked when offered the leadership, but eventually accepted.

In late spring 618, the Xiaoguo officers carried out their plot, and as they were trusted officers, they were able to quickly gain access to the palace. They quickly entered the palace, initially declaring that they were only intending to ask Emperor Yang to return to Chang'an, but soon showed that they intended more by starting to denounce Emperor Yang for his crimes, as well as killing his youngest son Yang Gao, the Prince of Zhao. Emperor Yang offered to commit suicide by poison, but poison could not be found quickly, and so one of the officers, Linghu Xingda (令狐行達), strangled him with his scarf as he requested.

Yuwen Huaji briefly considered declaring Emperor Yang's brother, the former Prince of Shu Yang Xiu, emperor, but the other coup leaders opposed the idea, and so Yang Xiu and his sons were put to death, as were Emperor Yang's son Yang Jian the Prince of Qi, Emperor Yang's grandson Yang Tan (楊倓) the Prince of Yan, and other members of the imperial Yang clan. A number of high level officials, including the prime minister Yu Shiji, Pei Yun (裴蘊), Lai Hu'er (來護兒), Yuan Chong (袁充), Yuwen Xie (宇文協), Yuwen Jiong (宇文皛), and Xiao Ju (蕭矩) the Duke of Liang (the nephew of Emperor Yang's wife Empress Xiao), were also put to death. However, as Emperor Yang's nephew Yang Hao, the Prince of Qin, was a friend of Yuwen Zhiji, Yuwen Zhiji protected him, and Yang Hao was not killed. Yuwen Huaji also spared two other key officials—Pei Ju (on the basis that Pei had treated the Xiaoguo soldiers well) and Su Wei (on the basis that Su had largely been ignored by Emperor Yang late in his reign).

== As regent over Yang Hao ==
Yuwen Huaji declared himself grand chancellor and effectively served as regent. He issued an edict in Empress Xiao's name, declaring Yang Hao emperor, but did not allow Yang Hao to actually exercise any imperial authorities. He soon gathered Emperor Yang's court, including his concubines and ladies in waiting, as well as officials, and began heading back northwest, toward the eastern capital Luoyang, leaving the general Chen Leng (陳稜) in charge at Jiangdu. On the way, the Xiaoguo officers Mai Mengcai (麥孟才), Qian Jie (錢傑), and Shen Guang (沈光) tried to carry out a counter-coup to overthrow Yuwen Huaji and to avenge Emperor Yang, but they only succeeded in killing the co-conspirator Yuan Min (元敏) before they were surrounded and killed.

Meanwhile, Yuwen Huaji began to live in luxury, using items and ceremonies only appropriate for emperors. Not willing to abandon Emperor Yang's treasures, he carried them along, at great expense in manpower. Shocked at Yuwen Huaji's conduct, Sima Dekan, Zhao Xingshu, along with several other officers, plotted against Yuwen Huaji, planning to support Sima as leader instead. However, when they secretly asked for support from the nearby agrarian rebel leader Meng Haigong (孟海公), Meng did not respond quickly, and the plot leaked. Yuwen Huaji sent Yuwen Shiji to arrest Sima. He rebuked Sima:

"We have together tried to pacify the empire, and it can be said that we have survived 10,000 deaths. Now that we have accomplished it, it is time for us to share our honors. Why were you plotting against me?"

Sima responded:

"We executed the tyrant [i.e., Emperor Yang] because we could not endure his immorality and cruelty, and we supported you. You, instead, are even worse than the tyrant. I was forced into this."

Yuwen Huaji then had Sima executed.

As Yuwen Huaji approached Luoyang, the rebel leader Li Mi, who controlled the region, resisted him. Yuwen Huaji initially could not get past Li, and therefore went to and took over Dong Commandery (東郡, roughly modern Anyang, Henan). Both Li Mi and the Sui officials at Luoyang (who had, after hearing of Emperor Yang's death, declared Emperor Yang's grandson Yang Tong the Prince of Yue emperor) were apprehensive of Yuwen Huaji's next move, and they, previously enemies, entered into an alliance where Li, previously showing imperial ambitions of his own, accepted a Sui-bestowed title of Duke of Wei and nominally submitted to Yang Tong. Yuwen Huaji made several attacks on Li Mi but could not prevail. Li, knowing that Yuwen Huaji's food supplies were running out, pretended to offer peace to Yuwen, agreeing to supply Yuwen's army with food, but instead planning to withhold food and, once Yuwen's food supplies did run out, attack. Li's plans, however, became known by Yuwen, and he in turn made a surprise attack on Li, nearly killing Li, but Li's general Qin Shubao protected Li from death, and eventually Yuwen was repelled. Yuwen, unable to gain food, headed north away from Li, and Li did not trail him. Many of his soldiers surrendered to Li, but he still had some 20,000 men by this point.

After Yuwen Huaji reached Wei (魏縣, in modern Handan, Hebei), his close associate Zhang Kai (張愷), who had previously helped him suppress Sima's plot, plotted against him. Yuwen Huaji discovered the plot and executed Zhang and his co-conspirators, but by this point was growing increasingly despondent over the increasing desertions from his rank. He and his brothers often feasted and wept at the feast, and he and Yuwen Zhiji blamed each other for the plot. Yuwen Huaji, believing that defeat was near, wanted to take imperial title. In fall 618, he therefore poisoned Yang Hao to death and declared himself emperor of the state of Xu.

== As emperor of Xu ==
In spring 619, Yuwen Huaji attacked Yuan Baozang (元寶藏), a general previously under Li Mi. (Li Mi had been defeated by the Sui general Wang Shichong in fall 618 and subsequently fled to the newly established Tang dynasty, although he then tried to rebel against Tang in winter 618 and was killed around the new year 619.) Yuan surrendered to Tang, and subsequently, the Tang general Li Shentong (李神通, a cousin of the Tang emperor Emperor Gaozu), in turn attacked Yuwen Huaji. Yuwen Huaji could not resist Li Shentong's attacks and fled east to Liaocheng. Li Shentong trailed him and put Liaocheng under siege.

Yuwen Huaji then tried to use the treasures he carried to entice other rebel generals into assisting him. Wang Bo (王薄) accepted, and entered Liaocheng to help defend it. Soon, however, Yuwen Huaji ran out of food and offered to surrender to Li Shentong. Li Shentong's assistant Cui Min'gan (崔民幹) suggested that Li Shentong accept the surrender, but Li Shentong, wanting to show off his power and also to seize Yuwen's treasures to award to his soldiers, refused. Meanwhile, Yuwen Huaji had sent Yuwen Shiji out of the city to seek food, and Yuwen Shiji was able to deliver some food supplies to Liaocheng, allowing Yuwen Huaji to recover somewhat, and therefore he withdrew his surrender offer and continued to resist. Li Shentong could not capture the city.

However, Dou Jiande the Prince of Xia, another rebel leader intent on attacking Yuwen Huaji, soon arrived, forcing Li Shentong to withdraw. Dou put Liaocheng under siege as well, and Wang Bo opened the city gates to welcome Xia forces in. Dou captured Yuwen Huaji and, referring to himself as "your subject" when greeting Empress Xiao, declared a mourning period for Emperor Yang and comforted the Sui officials. He arrested Yuwen Zhiji, Yang Shilan, and several other associates of Yuwen Huaji, executing them publicly. He then delivered Yuwen Huaji and Yuwen Huaji's sons Yuwen Chengji (宇文承基) and Yuwen Chengzhi (宇文承阯) to his base Xiangguo (襄國, in modern Xingtai, Hebei) and had them beheaded in public. Before Yuwen Huaji was executed, the only thing he stated was, "I have never done any harm to the Prince of Xia!"

Yuwen Huaji's brother, Yuwen Shiji, survived and later became an important official of the new Tang dynasty.

== Family ==
- Father
  - Yuwen Shu(宇文述), Sui dynasty general
- Children
  - Yuwen Chengji (宇文承基) (executed by Dou Jiande 619)
  - Yuwen Chengzhi (宇文承趾) (executed by Dou Jiande 619)
  - At least one more son

Note: In the novel Shuo Tang Yanyi (Tales of Tang dynasty), he has a son named Yuwen Chengdu (宇文成都), who is said the strongest warrior of Sui dynasty, and other two sons named Yuwen Chenglong (宇文成龙) and Yuwen Chenghu (宇文成虎).

- Brothers
  - Yuwen Zhiji (宇文智及), general of Sui dynasty (executed by Dou Jiande)
  - Yuwen Shiji (宇文士及), general of Sui dynasty, but he accepted the advice from his friend Yang Yichen (general of Sui dynasty, garrisoned in Fort Dongling) and surrendered to Li Yuan (the founder of the Tang dynasty) before Yuwen Huaji claimed to be the emperor. He was the only person in his family that survived after 619 and eventually he became a prime minister of the Tang dynasty.
  - Yuwen Huiji (宇文惠及), general of Sui dynasty. Died in early years.

== Popular culture ==
- Portrayed by Yoon Chul-hyung in 2006-2007 SBS TV series Yeon Gaesomun.

Regnal titles
Preceded by Yang Hao of Sui dynasty	Emperor of China (Xiaoguo Army); 618–619	Succeeded by None (army disbanded by Dou Jiande)
