= Dou Jiande =

Chinese rebel leader (573–621)

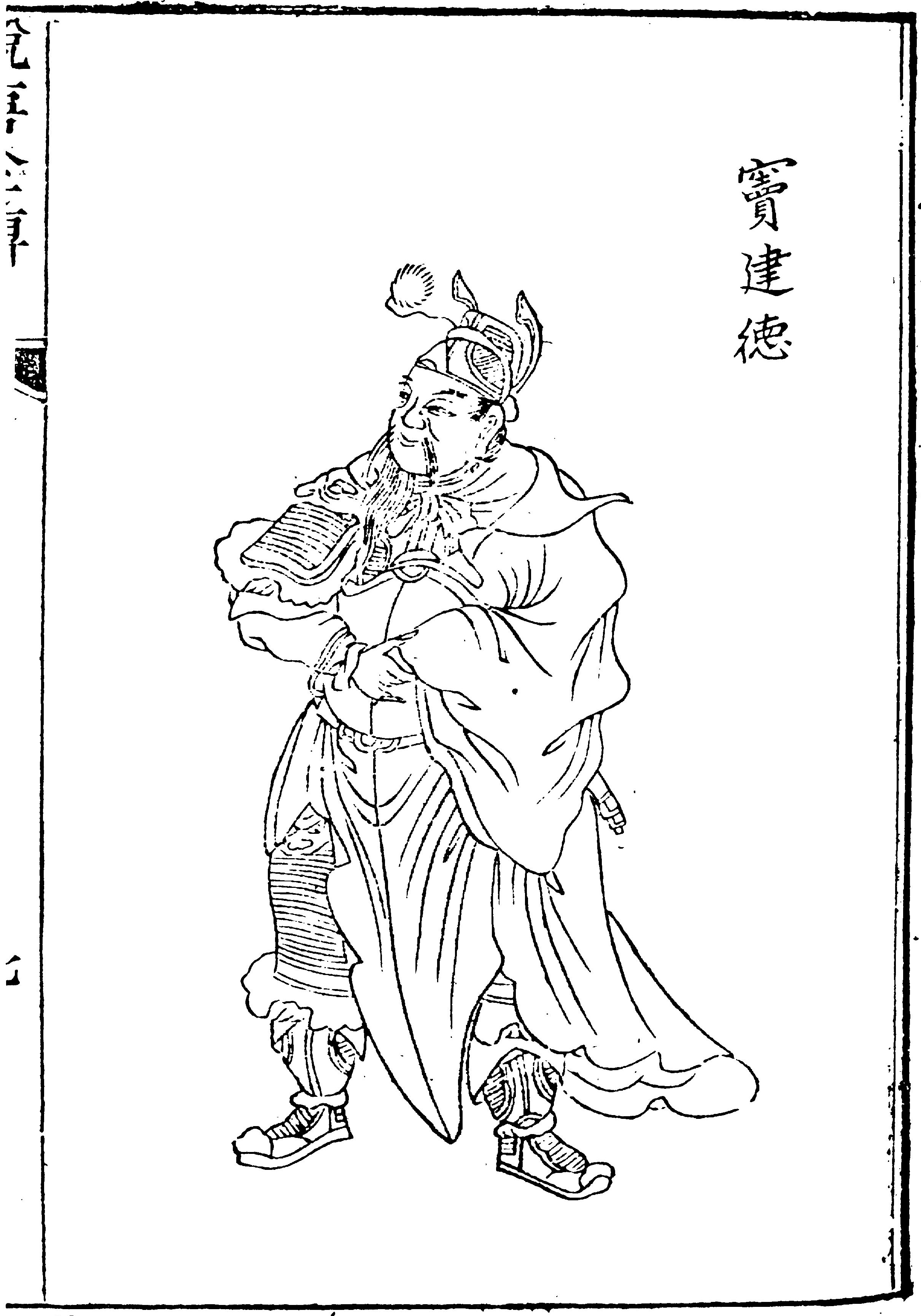
- Reign: 15 February 617 – 28 May 621
- Born: 573
- Died: 3 August 621
- Spouse: Lady Cao (曹氏)
Era dates
- Dīngchǒu (丁丑) 617–618; Wǔfèng (五鳳) 618–621
- Dynasty: Xìa (夏)

Dou Jiande
- Traditional Chinese: 竇建德
- Simplified Chinese: 窦建德
Transcriptions
Standard Mandarin
- Hanyu Pinyin: Dòu Jiàndé
- Wade–Giles: Tou^{4} Chien^{4}-tê^{2}
- IPA: [tôʊ tɕjɛ̂n.tɤ̌]
Yue: Cantonese
- Yale Romanization: Dauh Gin-dāk
- Jyutping: Dau6 Gin3-dak1
- IPA: [tɐw˨ kin˧.tɐk̚˥]

Dou Jiande (Chinese: 竇建德; 573 – 3 August 621) was a Chinese rebel leader who led the agrarian rebels who rose against the rule of Emperor Yang of Sui near the end of the Chinese Sui dynasty. Generally considered the kindest and most able of the agrarian rebel leaders of the time, he was eventually able to capture the modern Hebei region and declare himself initially the Prince of Changle, and then the Prince of Xia. In 621, when the Tang dynasty general Li Shimin (later Emperor Taizong) attacked Wang Shichong the Emperor of Zheng, who ruled the modern Henan region, Dou believed that if Tang were able to destroy Zheng, his own Xia state would suffer the same fate, and therefore went to Wang's aid, against the advice of his strategist Ling Jing (凌敬) and his wife Empress Cao. Li defeated him at the Battle of Hulao, capturing him. Li's father Emperor Gaozu of Tang subsequently put Dou to death. Xia territory was briefly seized by Tang, but soon Dou's general Liu Heita rose against Tang rule, recapturing Dou's territory, and held out against Tang until 623.

== Initial uprising and service under Gao Shida ==
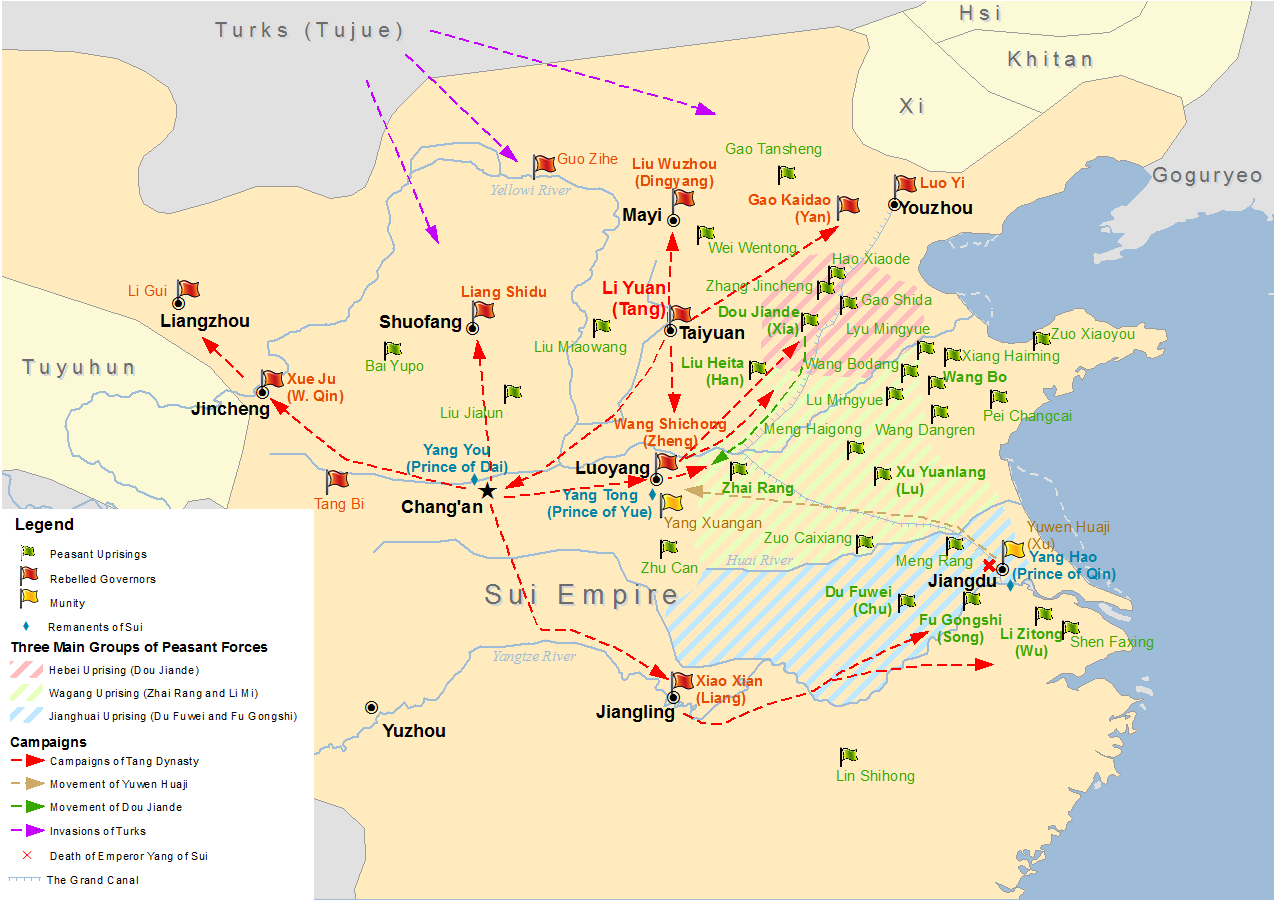
Map showing major uprisings and rebellions in the last years of Sui dynasty. The region controlled by Dou Jiande and Gao Shida is shown in pink shade.

Dou Jiande was born in 573, when his birth area Zhangnan County (漳南縣, in modern Handan, Hebei) was under the rule of Northern Qi, although subsequently it came under the rule of Northern Zhou and then Sui dynasty. It was said that in his youth, his honesty and willingness to help others made him well known in his home territory. In particular, once, when a man from his county lost his parents but was too poor to give his parents a proper burial, Dou was tilling in the fields, but he dropped his tilling and immediately went to help the man bury his parents, and after this incident he became particularly praised among the people. For a while, he served as the leader of the neighborhood, but after he was accused of crimes, he fled, returning home only after a general pardon. When his father died, more than a thousand people attended the funeral, and Dou refused all gifts given him for the funeral.

In 611, when Emperor Yang of Sui was conscripting men for his campaign against Goguryeo, Dou was conscripted and selected to be the commander of 200 men. During those times, there were floods afflicting the region east of the Taihang Mountains. One of the men from Dou's home county, Sun Anzu (孫安祖), whose house had recently been destroyed in the flood and whose wife had starved to death, was also conscripted. Sun tried to obtain an exemption from conscription, but the county magistrate, in anger, whipped him. Sun assassinated the county magistrate and fled to Dou's home, where Dou hid him. As the region was afflicted with a famine in the aftermaths of the floods, Dou told Sun:

During the reign of [Emperor Yang's father] Emperor Wen, the empire was prosperous and wealthy, and he collected a million men to attack Goguryeo but was nevertheless defeated. Now we are facing floods and poverty, and people were not returning from repeated conscriptions and not recovering. The emperor does not care about these things, but instead personally leads the army against Goguryeo. The empire will surely be in great disturbance soon. A man who escapes death should do great things. How can you stay here and be a fleeing felon?

He therefore gathered several hundred men of the region and gave them to Sun to lead, to become bandits at the nearby Gaoji Pond (高雞泊). Meanwhile, there were other bands of bandits in the same commandery, Qinghe (清河, roughly modern Xingtai, Hebei), led by Zhang Jincheng (張金稱) and Gao Shida (高士達). The bandits knew Dou's reputation and were not pillaging his home. The county magistrates of Dou's and nearby counties thus suspected Dou of conspiring with the bandits, and once, when Dou happened to be away from home, they ambushed Dou's house and slaughtered his family. Dou took 200 men and fled to Gao, who claimed the title Duke of Donghai and made Dou a general. Soon, Zhang killed Sun, and Sun's men largely fled to Dou. Dou become the commander of an army of more than 10,000 men. It was said at this time that Dou was open to other opinions, and he shared both the spoils and the labors with his soldiers, and therefore his soldiers were willing to fight and die for him.

In 616, Guo Xuan (郭絢) the governor of Zhuo Commandery (涿郡, roughly modern Beijing) led a Sui army against Gao. Gao realized that he was not as capable as Dou, so he promoted Dou to the leader of his army. Dou asked Gao to safeguard their homebase, and then led 7,000 men against Guo, pretending to be betraying Gao and surrendering, particularly having Gao publicly execute a woman that Gao claimed to be Dou's wife. Guo, not suspecting Dou, proceeded at once to join Dou, planning to attack Gao together. Dou ambushed and killed him, seizing his army and horses. Thereafter, Dou became even more famous.

Later that year, one of the most capable Sui generals, Yang Yichen, defeated Zhang and slaughtered his troops. The survivors fled to Dou. Yang then followed up by attacking Gao. Dou, advising Gao not to engage Yang directly, stated:

Among Sui generals, none is more capable than Yang Yichen. He had just defeated Zhang Jincheng and is now attacking us, and he is difficult to resist right now. Please avoid him and let him wait and be unable to engage us. Once his soldiers are tired, we will ambush him and achieve a great victory. If you fight him now, I am afraid that you, Duke, will not be able to defeat him.

Gao disagreed, and, leaving Dou in charge of the base, engaged Yang. Gao achieved initial success against Yang, and became arrogant, feasting on the battlefield. When Dou heard this, he, in surprise, stated, "The Duke of Donghai has not yet defeated the enemy but has become arrogant. A disaster will happen soon. After the Sui victory, they will attack here as well, and I am afraid we will not be spared." Several days later, Yang defeated Gao and killed him on the battlefield. He then attacked Dou, whose army collapsed. Dou fled, and Yang, not believing that he would be able to accomplish much, withdrew. Dou returned and gathered the remnants of Gao's army, and he publicly observed a mourning period for Gao. After his army had recovered somewhat, he claimed the title of general, and he began to capture territory around him. It was said that the rebels had hated Sui officials so much that they largely slaughtered Sui officials whenever they could find those officials. However, Dou did not do so, and treated Sui officials and scholars kindly, and therefore at times Sui officials would even surrender their cities to him. He soon had more than 100,000 soldiers under his command.

== Nominal submission to Li Mi and Yang Tong ==
Map of the situation in northern China during the transition from the Sui to the Tang, with the main contenders for the throne and the main military operations

In spring 617, Dou claimed the title of Prince of Changle and also changed the era name that his followers used, from Emperor Yang's Daye (大業) to Dingchou (丁丑), thus subtly signifying an official break from Sui.

In fall 617, at Emperor Yang's orders, the general Xue Shixiong (薛世雄), who was in charge of defending Zhuo Commandery, led his 30,000 men south, intending to attack Li Mi—then generally recognized as the strongest rebel leader. As Xue went through Hejian Commandery (河間, roughly modern Cangzhou, Hebei), near Dou's holdings, Dou's army became fearful and fled. Xue thus took no further precautions, believing Dou to pose no further threat. Dou instead planned a surprise attack, leading 280 of his best soldiers personally as the forward assault force at night while having the rest of his men trail. He made an agreement with them: if they reached Xue's camp at night, they would make a surprise attack, but if it was already the day by the time that they arrived, they would surrender. The sun rose when Dou was almost at Xue's camp, and Dou, fearful that he would be crushed by Xue, discussed with his men whether to surrender. Suddenly, a thick fog descended over the scene, and Dou gladly stated, "The Heavens are helping us!" He then made a surprise attack on Xue's camp, causing Xue's army to panic and collapse. Xue fled back to Zhuo Commandery with fewer than 100 men, and died in anger there. Meanwhile, Dou continued to expand but, knowing that Li, then occupying modern central and eastern Henan, had the stronger army, he sent messengers to nominally submit to Li. In spring 618, after Li had a major victory over the Sui general Wang Shichong, whom Emperor Yang had sent from Jiangdu (江都, in modern Yangzhou, Jiangsu) to aid the eastern capital Luoyang, Dou, along with several other rebel leaders, sent a submission to Li, then carrying the self-declared title of Duke of Wei, urging him to take imperial title. Li declined. Meanwhile, Li's subordinate Fang Yanzao (房彥藻) wrote Dou, inviting Dou to meet Li to show his loyalty. Dou wrote back in humble and polite terms, but declined with the excuse that he needed to defend an attack from Luo Yi (a former Sui official who had seized Zhuo Commandery himself) from the north. (Later that year, Wang defeated Li, causing Li to flee west and surrender to Emperor Gaozu of Tang (Li Yuan), a former Sui general who had rebelled in 617 and established Tang dynasty in spring 618, although he was eventually killed by Tang forces after attempting to reestablish his independence.)

Soon, news arrived from Jiangdu that Emperor Yang had been killed in a coup led by the general Yuwen Huaji. The Sui official Wang Cong (王琮), who had held out against Dou at Hejian, observed a mourning period for Emperor Yang, and Dou, in response, sent a messenger to Wang to express condolences. Wang then surrendered to Dou. As Wang had previously had several victories over Dou's soldiers, Dou's soldiers wanted Wang put to death, but Dou pointed out that Wang's faithfulness to Sui should be rewarded, and therefore made Wang a prefectural prefect. A number of other Sui commanderies also surrendered to him. He then began to organize his staff into a governmental structure, and he set his capital at Leshou (樂壽, in modern Cangzhou). In winter 618, after five large birds appeared at Leshou, with an assortment of over 10,000 small birds, and later left, Dou, believing them to be fenghuang (phoenixes), changed his era name to Wufeng (五鳳). Further, at the suggestion of his officials Song Zhengben (宋正本) and Kong Deshao (孔德紹), he changed his title to Prince of Xia. Also at this time, Dou surprised and killed another major rebel leader, Wei Dao'er (魏刀兒), who had claimed the title of Emperor of Wei, seizing Wei's forces. He also sent messengers to Luo, trying to persuade Luo to submit. Luo, believing both Dou and Gao Kaidao (who also tried to get him to submit) to be simply bandits, instead submitted to Tang. Dou led his forces against Luo, but could not capture Luo's base at You Prefecture (幽州, converted from Zhuo Commandery) and had to withdraw.

Meanwhile, Yuwen, after killing Emperor Yang, had advanced north with Sui's elite Xiaoguo Army (驍果), and he had, after first declaring Emperor Yang's nephew Yang Hao emperor and then poisoned Yang Hao and been several times defeated by Li Mi and then the Tang general Li Shentong (李神通, Emperor Gaozu's cousin), declared himself Emperor of Xu and settled in at Liaocheng (聊城, in modern Liaocheng, Shandong). In spring 619, Dou proclaimed, "I was a Sui subject, and the Sui emperor was my lord. Yuwen Huaji killed my lord, and is therefore my enemy, and I must attack him." He therefore marched on to Liaocheng. Yuwen engaged him outside the city, and Dou defeated him repeatedly, forcing him back into Liaocheng to defend it. Dou put Liaocheng under siege, and the rebel leader Wang Bo (王薄), whom Yuwen had enticed with treasure to help defend the city, opened the city gates and welcomed Dou in. Dou captured Yuwen and formally greeted Emperor Yang's wife Empress Xiao, referring to himself as "your subject." He then carried out a mourning period for Emperor Yang while comforting the Sui officials that had been forced to follow Yuwen. He then executed Yuwen and several of his key associates. He disbanded the large group of Emperor Yang's ladies-in-waiting that Yuwen had brought along, and disbanded the Xiaoguo Army as well. The Old Book of Tang, while written from Tang's standpoint, praised Dou in this way in the aftermaths of the battle:

Every time that Dou Jiande was successful in battle or in capturing a city, the treasures he received were all divided for the soldiers, and he did not personally take anything. His daily life was frugal and simple. He did not feast on meat, instead eating vegetables and unrefined grain. His wife Lady Cao wore only cloth, not silk, and had fewer than 10 servant girls.

After this victory, Dou made peace with Wang Shichong and nominally submitted to Yang Tong, the grandson of Emperor Yang who claimed Sui's imperial title at Luoyang after Emperor Yang's death (and whose court was then controlled by Wang Shichong). Yang Tong, in accordance with Dou's own title, created him the Prince of Xia. Meanwhile, Dou incorporated many key Sui officials into his government, particularly entrusting Pei Ju with reorganizing his government in the form of an imperial one.

== Independent reign as Prince of Xia ==
In summer 619, Wang Shichong had Yang Tong yield the throne to him, ending Sui and establishing a new state of Zheng. In response, Dou cut off relations with Wang, and began to take on imperial style in his edicts and ceremonies, although he was still using the title of Prince of Xia and not emperor. (It might have been at this time that his wife Lady Cao assumed the title of empress.) He created Emperor Yang's infant grandson Yang Zhengdao the Duke of Xun, and gave Emperor Yang the posthumous name of Min. He entered into an alliance with the Eastern Turks (Dongtujue)'s Shibi Khan Ashina Duojishi, and at the request of Ashina Duojishi's wife, Sui's Princess Yicheng, he delivered Empress Xiao and Yang Zhengdao, as well as the head of Yuwen Huaji, to her. Meanwhile, with certain prefectures north of the Yellow River having submitted to either Tang or Zheng, he carried out a campaign to capture them over the next several months, and was largely successful. By fall 619, Li Shentong, responsible for the Tang operations in the area, had been forced to withdraw to Liyang (黎陽, in modern Hebi, Henan), to join forces with another Tang general, Li Shiji (a former follower of Li Mi). In winter 619, while proceeding toward Wei Prefecture (衛州, roughly modern Xinxiang, Henan), he was ambushed by Li Shiji, and, in anger, he attacked Liyang, capturing it as well as Li Shentong, Li Shiji's father Li Gai (李蓋), Wei Zheng, and Emperor Gaozu's sister Princess Tong'an. Li Shiji was able to escape, but several days later returned and surrendered to Dou, because Dou had captured Li Gai. Dou made Wei Zheng a staff member, while still letting Li Shiji guard Liyang, but holding Li Gai as hostage, as well as Li Shentong and Princess Tong'an, but treating them with respect and care. He moved his capital from Leshou to Ming Prefecture (洺州, roughly modern Handan, Hebei). By this point, the territory north of the Yellow River and east of the Taihang Mountains were largely his, save for those under the control of Luo Yi (who had now taken the name Li Yi, having been granted the imperial surname of Li by Tang's Emperor Gaozu) and Gao Kaidao.

In winter 619, Li Shiji considered fleeing to Tang territory, but was fearful that Dou would execute his father Li Gai, and therefore attacked Zheng to gain Dou's trust. In one of the battles against Zheng, Li captured the Zheng army officer Liu Heita, whom Dou was impressed with and created the Duke of Handong. Liu became a trusted general of Dou's, and was often in charge of making surprise attacks and conducting surveillance missions. Around the new year 620, Li Shiji further suggested to Dou that they should attack Cao (曹州) and Dai (戴州) Prefectures (together making up about modern Heze, Shandong), then controlled by the agrarian leader Meng Haigong (孟海公) and nominally submitting to Zheng. Li Shiji was planning to ambush Dou as soon as he crossed the Yellow River, but Dou was delayed by Empress Cao's giving birth. Meanwhile, Li Shiji's ally Li Shanghu (李商胡) could not wait, and ambushed Empress Cao's brother Cao Dan (曹旦), but was not able to kill Cao. Li Shiji, hearing the news, fled to Tang territory. When the Xia officials requested that Li Gai be executed, however, Dou stated, "Li Shiji was a Tang subject whom we captured, and he did not forget his former lord. He is a faithful man. What crime has his father committed?" He thus spared Li Gai. He soon defeated and killed Li Shanghu. It was described that by this point, Dou was encouraging his people to farm, and that his realm was peaceful, without banditry, and that merchants and travelers were comfortable enough to spend the night in the wilderness.

In summer 620, Dou made another attack on Li Yi, but again could not capture You Prefecture. Meanwhile, his general Wang Fubao (王伏寶), one of his most capable generals, was despised by other generals jealous of his talent. They therefore falsely accused him of treason, and Dou executed him. Thereafter, Dou began to suffer more and more military defeats.

In fall 620, Tang's Emperor Gaozu sought peace with Xia. Dou agreed to the peace proposal, and sent Princess Tong'an back to Tang, although he continued to hold Li Shentong. In winter 620, he made another attack on Li Yi but again failed to capture You Prefecture. Also around this time, Ashina Duojishi's brother and successor, the Chuluo Khan Ashina Qilifu planned a major assault on Tang, and as part of the plan, he requested Dou to cross the Taihang Mountains and meet him at Jin (晉州, roughly modern Linfen, Shanxi) and Jiang (絳州, roughly modern Yuncheng, Shanxi) Prefectures, but Ashina Qilifu soon died and did not carry out the campaign. At the same time, Dou also executed Song, who often gave Dou honest and valid criticism, after false accusations, and it was said that thereafter no one dared to criticise Dou further, and that Dou's governance began to suffer because of it.

In spring 621, Dou defeated Meng Haigong and captured him, keeping him as a general.

== Defeat and death ==
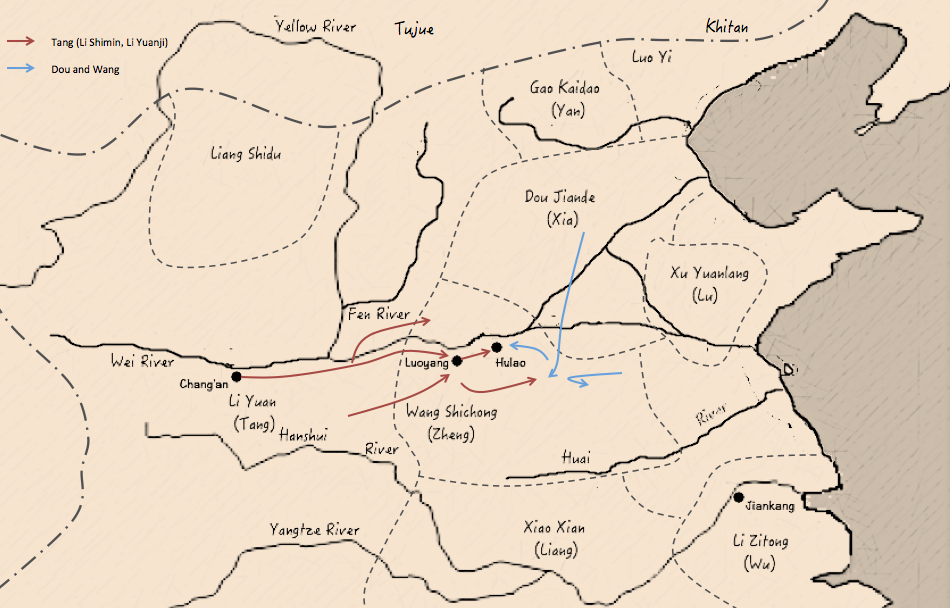
Battle of Hulao

Meanwhile, around the same time, the Tang general Li Shimin (Emperor Gaozu's son) was leading a major attack on Zheng's capital Luoyang. Wang Shichong, unable to fend off the attack by himself, sought aid from Dou Jiande, even though Xia and Zheng had previously had a poor relationship. Dou's official Liu Bin (劉彬) suggested that he aid Zheng, reasoning that if Tang destroyed Zheng, Xia would be under Tang's threat thereafter—and that if he were victorious, he could then consider seizing Zheng territory. Dou agreed and sent messengers to Wang, promising support, while sending his official Li Dashi to Li Shimin, requesting that he end his campaign against Luoyang. Li Shimin, however, detained Li Dashi and did not respond.

Dou then merged the troops from Meng Haigong and Xu Yuanlang (whom he had defeated earlier as well) and headed from Meng's headquarters at Cao Prefecture (in modern Heze as well) toward Luoyang, joining forces with the Zheng general Guo Shiheng (郭士衡), and he defeated several cities held by Tang. He notified Wang that the Xia forces were on the way, and also wrote Li Shimin to again request Li Shimin to withdraw and return the seized land to Zheng. When Li Shimin discussed this proposal with his generals, most believed that they should avoid Dou, but Guo Xiaoke (郭孝恪) disagreed, believing that this was a good chance to destroy both Wang and Dou. He suggested for Li Shimin to proceed to Hulao Pass, east of Luoyang, and defend it against the coming Dou attack. Li Shimin agreed. He left his brother Li Yuanji and the general Qutu Tong (屈突通) at Luoyang, continuing the siege, while proceeding to Hulao himself. Wang saw Li Shimin's troop movement, but not sure what Li Shimin was intending to do, took no action.

Li Shimin's forces quickly engaged some of Dou's forward forces, and Tang forces initially prevailed. Li Shimin then wrote to Dou, trying to persuade him to end his attempt to save Wang, but Dou persisted and proceeded to Hulao himself. The armies then stalemated at Hulao. Dou's strategist Ling Jing (凌敬) suggested that instead of heading to Zheng's capital Luoyang, which Li was sieging, that he attack Tang's Fen (汾州, roughly modern Lüliang, Shanxi) and Jin (晉州, roughly modern Linfen, Shanxi) Prefectures and be poised to further attack Tang's capital Chang'an in order to seize Tang territory as well as force Li to give up the siege on Luoyang. However, Wang's emissaries Wang Wan (王琬, Wang Shichong's nephew) and Zhangsun Anshi (長孫安世) persuaded Dou that Luoyang was about to fall and needed his aid immediately, and so Dou headed for Luoyang. When Empress Cao heard this, she tried to persuade Dou to accept Ling's plan, stating:

The strategy of the Secretary General [(i.e., Ling)] must be accepted, and I do not understand why Your Royal Highness would not accept it. Your Royal Highness should enter through Fukou [(滏口, in modern Handan, Hebei)] into Tang's weak spot. Connect your camps and capture the area north of the Taihang Mountains. This, combined with the Eastern Turks' pillages against Guanzhong [(Tang's capital region)], will force Tang forces to withdraw to save themselves. Why worry that you cannot lift the siege on Luoyang? If you remain here, the officers and the soldiers will all be tired, and you will spend much material, and you will not be successful.

Dou, however, responded:

You women will not understand this. We came to save Luoyang, which is in dire straits and about to fall. If we abandon it and leave, we show that we are fearful of the enemy and turning our back on faith and righteousness. I cannot do this.

On one day in summer 621, Dou launched an all-out attack on Hulao, but Li Shimin, wanting to wear him out, declined his challenge, and later during the day, after the Xia soldiers had become tired, Li Shimin launched his counterattack. The Xia forces panicked and collapsed. Dou was wounded by a spear, but still fled, but when he reached the Yellow River, intending to cross, he suddenly fell off his horse. The Tang generals Bai Shirang (白士讓) and Yang Wuwei (楊武威), who were chasing him, captured him and took him back to Li Shimin. Li Shimin rebuked him, "I was only attacking Wang Shichong. What have I done to you that you come out of your own realm and to interfere with me?" Dou responded sarcastically, "If I did not come, I would have required you to extend your campaign." Empress Cao and the Xia official Qi Shanshing (齊善行) fled back to Ming Prefecture.

Li Shimin took Dou, Wang Wan, and Zhangsun to Luoyang and displayed them to Wang Shichong. Wang Shichong considered fighting his way out of the siege and fleeing to Xiangyang (襄陽, in modern Xiangfan, Hubei), but his generals pointed out that they needed Dou's support, and now that Dou was captured, there was little else to do. Wang Shichong therefore surrendered Luoyang to Li Shimin. The cities in both Zheng and Xia territory largely surrendered to Tang.

Li Shimin took Dou and Wang Shichong back to the capital Chang'an to present to his father Emperor Gaozu. Emperor Gaozu spared Wang Shichong, but publicly executed Dou. When Dou's generals, who had already previously surrendered or hid themselves in the countryside, heard about Dou's death, they rebelled under the leadership of Liu Heita, who publicly mourned Dou and was initially able to take back all of Xia territory, but eventually was defeated first by Li Shimin and then by Li Shimin's older brother Li Jiancheng and killed in 623.

Liu Xu, the lead editor of the Old Book of Tang who, despite his writing the work during Later Jin was writing from a Tang perspective, nevertheless commented:

Dou Jiande's faithfulness and righteousness made the people respect him. He used his might to occupy the area north of the Yellow River. He trained and commanded soldiers and gathered talented and intelligent men. He cut off relations with Wang Shichong and executed Yuwen Huaji. He spared Xu Gai, and he released Li Shentong. He was careful and dexterous, understanding and decisive, and his regime appeared to be on the rise. However, later on Song Zhengben and Wang Fubao were executed for false accusations, and the grand strategy submitted by Ling Jing and Lady Cao were not accepted. He finally fell and did not have a good result. That is because Heaven already showed its favor elsewhere, but also because his own strategies were not perfect.

== In popular culture ==
Dou Jiande is portrayed by Hong Kong actor Bobby Tsang in TVB's 1987 series The Grand Canal (大運河)

== Notes and references ==
- Old Book of Tang, vol. 54.
- New Book of Tang, vol. 85.
- Zizhi Tongjian, vols. 181, 183, 184, 185, 186, 187, 188, 189.

Regnal titles
Preceded by Emperor Yang of Sui	Ruler of China (Hebei); 617–621	Succeeded by Liu Heita (Prince of Handong)
