= Wuxue =

Wuxue 武穴市 Wusueh
- County-level city
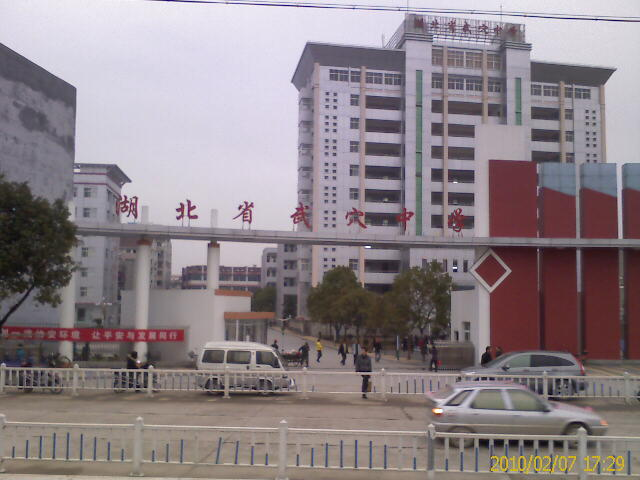
- Wuxue High School Main Gate (武穴中学校门)

- Location in Hubei
- Coordinates (Wuxue government): 29°50′38″N 115°33′40″E
- Country: People's Republic of China
- Province: Hubei
- Prefecture-level city: Huanggang

Area
  - County-level city: 1,241.7 km^{2} (479.4 sq mi)
  - Urban: 31.00 km^{2} (11.97 sq mi)

Population (2020 census)
  - County-level city: 676,264
  - Density: 544.63/km^{2} (1,410.6/sq mi)
  - Urban: 379,040
- Time zone: UTC+8 (China Standard)
- Website: 武穴市人民政府门户网站 (Wuxue City People's Government Web Portal) (in Simplified Chinese)

Wuxue (Chinese: 武穴; pinyin: Wǔxué), formerly Guangji County (simplified Chinese: 广济县; traditional Chinese: 廣濟縣; pinyin: Guǎngjì Xiàn; Postal Romanization: Kwangtsi), is a county-level city on the north shore of the Yangtze River in eastern Hubei province, People's Republic of China. Wuxue falls under the administration of the prefecture-level city of Huanggang.

== Geography ==
Wuxue's total population is about 580,000 and the city extends over 1,200 square kilometres (460 sq mi), almost all of which is cultivated.

The city has Mount Lu to the east, is close to the Qizhou hometown of famed ancient pharmacist Li Shizhen in neighboring Qichun County in the west, borders the Yangtze River in the south, and leans against the Dabie Shan mountain range in the north.

Wuxue is 220 kilometers downriver from the provincial capital of Wuhan and about 50 kilometers upriver from the port of Jiujiang City, on the south side of the Yangtze in Jiangxi province.

== Climate ==
Climate data for Wuxue, elevation 24 m (79 ft), (1991–2020 normals, extremes 1981–present)
Month	Jan	Feb	Mar	Apr	May	Jun	Jul	Aug	Sep	Oct	Nov	Dec	Year
Record high °C (°F)	19.1 (66.4)	26.8 (80.2)	33.8 (92.8)	32.2 (90.0)	36.1 (97.0)	37.8 (100.0)	39.2 (102.6)	38.7 (101.7)	37.4 (99.3)	39.6 (103.3)	27.9 (82.2)	21.2 (70.2)	39.6 (103.3)
Mean daily maximum °C (°F)	8.3 (46.9)	11.1 (52.0)	15.7 (60.3)	22.1 (71.8)	27.1 (80.8)	29.8 (85.6)	33.1 (91.6)	32.6 (90.7)	28.8 (83.8)	23.7 (74.7)	17.4 (63.3)	11.0 (51.8)	21.7 (71.1)
Daily mean °C (°F)	4.7 (40.5)	7.2 (45.0)	11.4 (52.5)	17.4 (63.3)	22.5 (72.5)	25.8 (78.4)	29.0 (84.2)	28.3 (82.9)	24.4 (75.9)	18.9 (66.0)	12.7 (54.9)	6.8 (44.2)	17.4 (63.4)
Mean daily minimum °C (°F)	2.0 (35.6)	4.3 (39.7)	8.1 (46.6)	13.7 (56.7)	18.9 (66.0)	22.7 (72.9)	25.6 (78.1)	25.2 (77.4)	21.1 (70.0)	15.3 (59.5)	9.3 (48.7)	3.7 (38.7)	14.2 (57.5)
Record low °C (°F)	−4.5 (23.9)	−5.9 (21.4)	−1.2 (29.8)	3.2 (37.8)	9.3 (48.7)	14.3 (57.7)	18.5 (65.3)	18.3 (64.9)	11.8 (53.2)	4.0 (39.2)	−1.4 (29.5)	−9.4 (15.1)	−9.4 (15.1)
Average precipitation mm (inches)	71.1 (2.80)	84.4 (3.32)	134.2 (5.28)	160.2 (6.31)	186.0 (7.32)	227.3 (8.95)	204.6 (8.06)	127.9 (5.04)	88.6 (3.49)	66.4 (2.61)	68.2 (2.69)	47.0 (1.85)	1,465.9 (57.72)
Average precipitation days (≥ 0.1 mm)	12.2	12.3	15.6	14.5	13.9	14.7	12.5	11.5	8.7	9.1	10.2	9.7	144.9
Average snowy days	3.5	1.7	0.4	0	0	0	0	0	0	0	0.1	1.0	6.7
Average relative humidity (%)	79	79	80	79	79	82	82	82	80	77	79	77	80
Mean monthly sunshine hours	98.7	100.5	120.7	148.5	167.9	157.0	218.5	216.9	175.9	161.5	138.5	125.1	1,829.7
Percentage possible sunshine	30	32	32	38	40	37	51	54	48	46	44	40	41
Source: China Meteorological Administration

== Administrative divisions ==
Wuxue administers four subdistricts and eight towns:

#	Name	Chinese (S)
Subdistricts
1	Wuxue Subdistrict	武穴街道
2	Kanjiang Subdistrict	刊江街道
3	Tianjiazhen Subdistrict (Tianzhen)	田家镇街道 (田镇街道)
4	Wanzhanghu Subdistrict	万丈湖街道
Towns
5	Meichuan Town	梅川镇
6	Yuchuan Town	余川镇
7	Huaqiao Town	花桥镇
8	Dajin Town	大金镇
9	Siwang Town	四望镇
10	Shifosi Town	石佛寺镇
11	Dafasi Town	大法寺镇
12	Longping Town	龙坪镇

== History ==
Wuxue opened as a port towards the end of the 16th century. Upon China signing the 1876 Yantai treaty with Britain, foreign merchants established an upgraded wharf.

The port's strategic advantage lies in its proximity to the juncture of three provinces — Hubei, Anhui, and Jiangxi — and serves as a central hub for commodity trade.

The port was modernized in 1953, with further-enhanced navigational improvements in 1975 and 1980. The total length of the port waterfront is now 14 kilometers, with 23 quay berths and many large warehouses, hoists, and cranes. The port handles both commodity and passenger traffic.

== Transportation ==
In addition to the port, Wuxue is known as the "Gateway to Three Provinces" (mentioned above). As well, it is served by the east-west inter-provincial Shanghai-Hibiscus Expressway, and is a major station on the Beijing-Guangzhou railway. A passenger ferry runs across the river and downstream to Jiujiang, and Wuxue is about one hour by car from Jiujiang airport.
