= Military history of the Sui dynasty =

Part of Chinese history, 581–618 CE

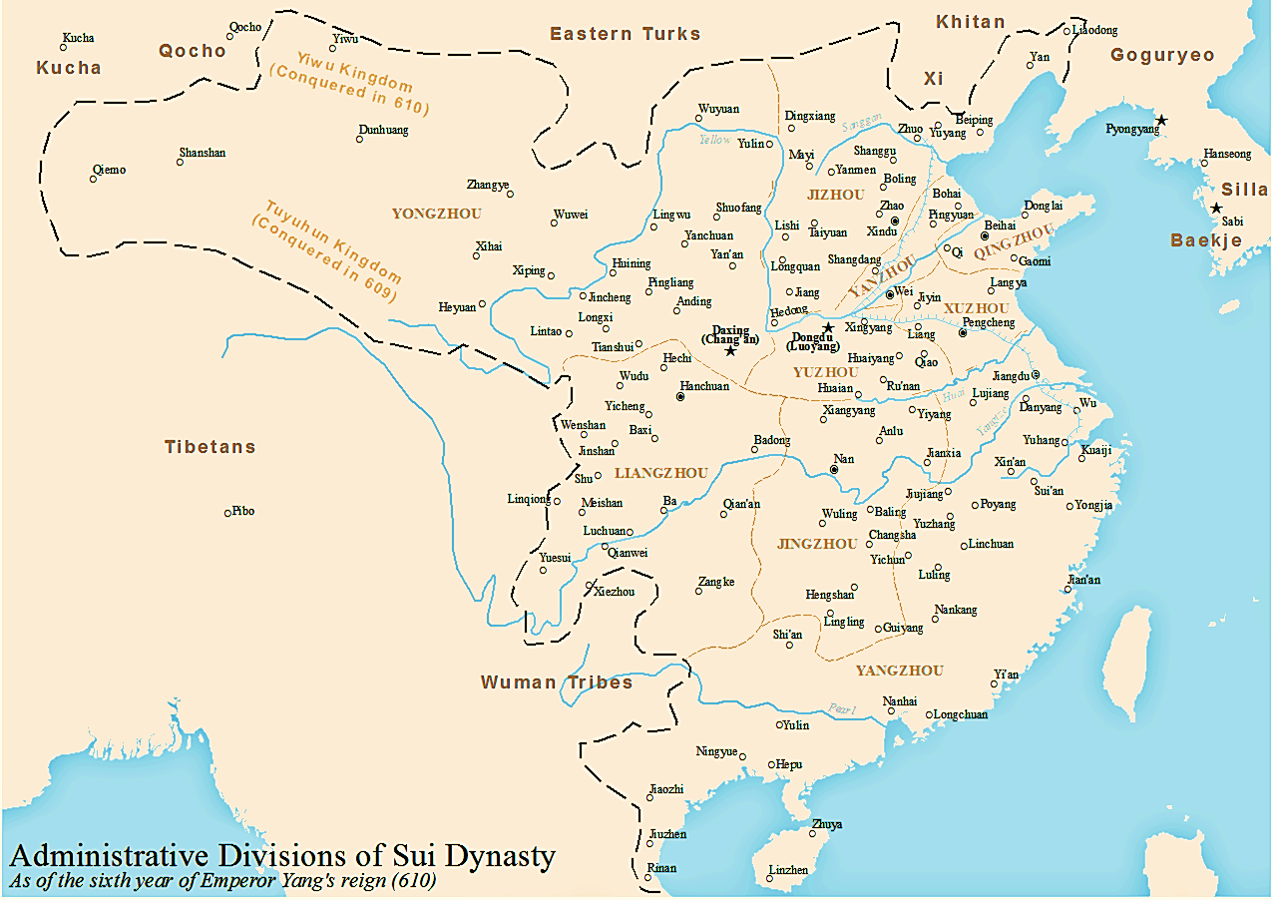
Sui dynasty in 610

The military history of the Sui dynasty encompasses the period of Chinese military activity from 581 to 618. Although the Sui dynasty was relatively short lived, it set the precedent for the Tang dynasty that followed.

== Organization ==
The Sui dynasty inherited the Twenty-four Armies from the Northern Zhou. The system of recruitment that created these armies would come to be known as fubing, or "territorial soldiery". Fubing soldiers were originally recruits drawn from the old military households of previous dynasties. Unlike the mass conscription of the Han dynasty, these soldiers were promised tangible rewards such as exemption from taxes and labor for their families. Later on, these soldiers were formed into units presiding over a plot of land on which they would farm privately to support themselves. Unlike the following Tang dynasty which implemented a centralized Ministry of the Army to which fubing units were answerable, the fubing answered only to local administration during the Sui dynasty.

== Equipment ==
The Sui dynasty made prodigious use of heavy cavalry and both men and horses were often heavily armoured.

The Book of Sui provides an account of the "first cavalry battalions" of the dynasty's Twenty-four armies. They wore "bright-brilliant" (mingguang) armour made of decarburized steel connected by dark green cords, their horses wore iron armour with dark green tassels, and they were distinguished by lion banners. Other battalions were also distinguished by their own colors, patterns, and flags, but neither the bright-brilliant armour or iron armour are mentioned.

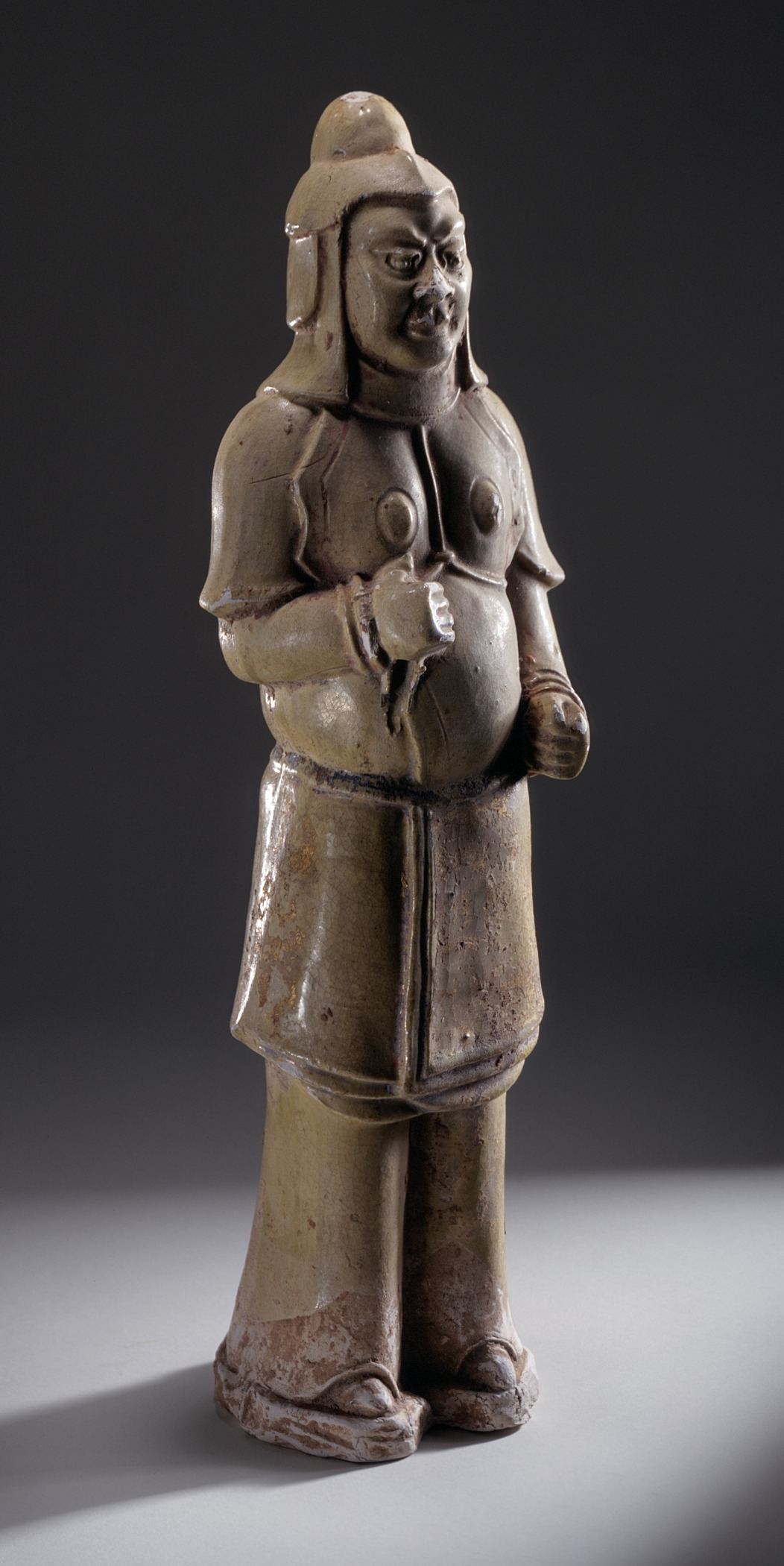
Sui soldier

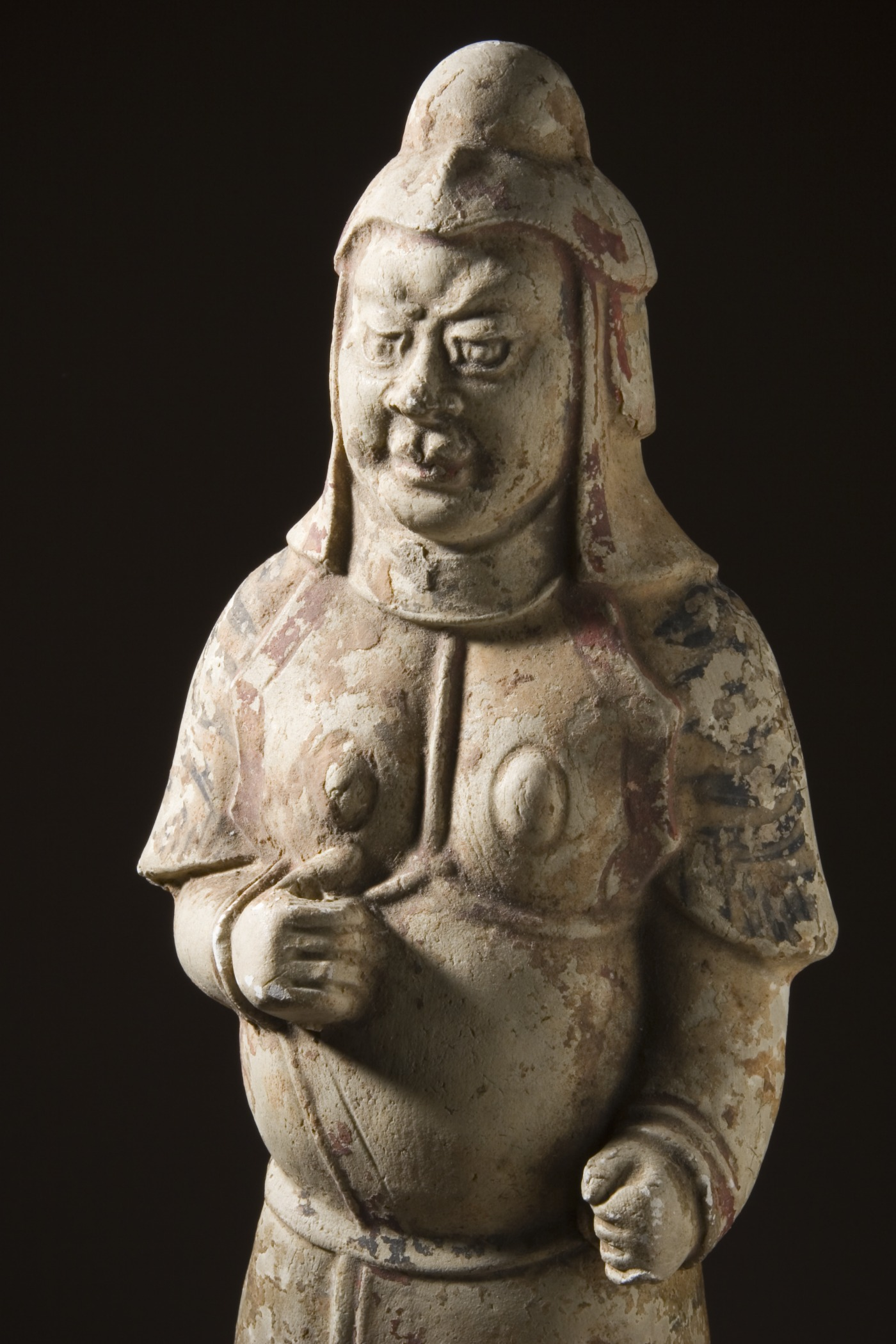
Sui soldier

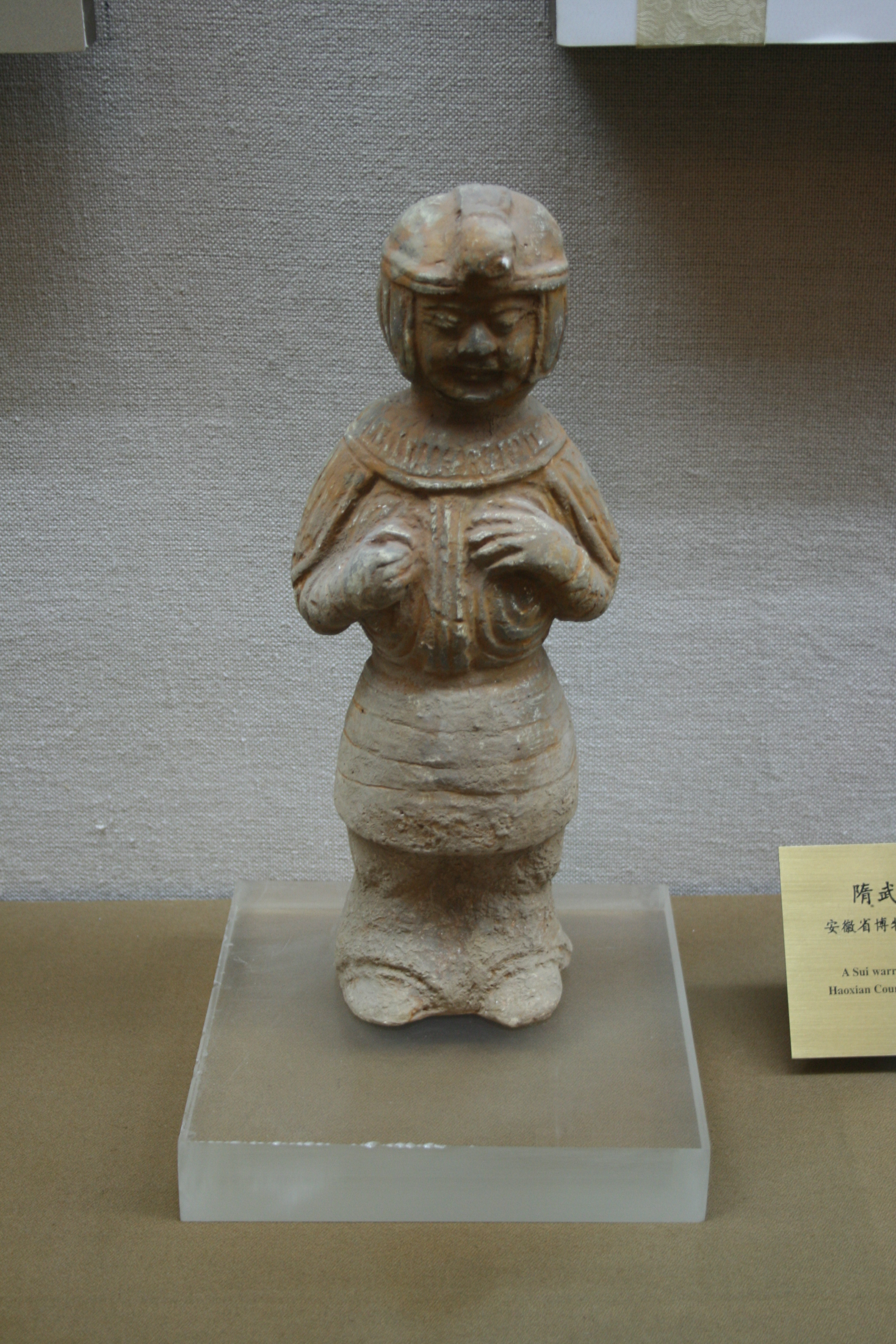
Sui soldier

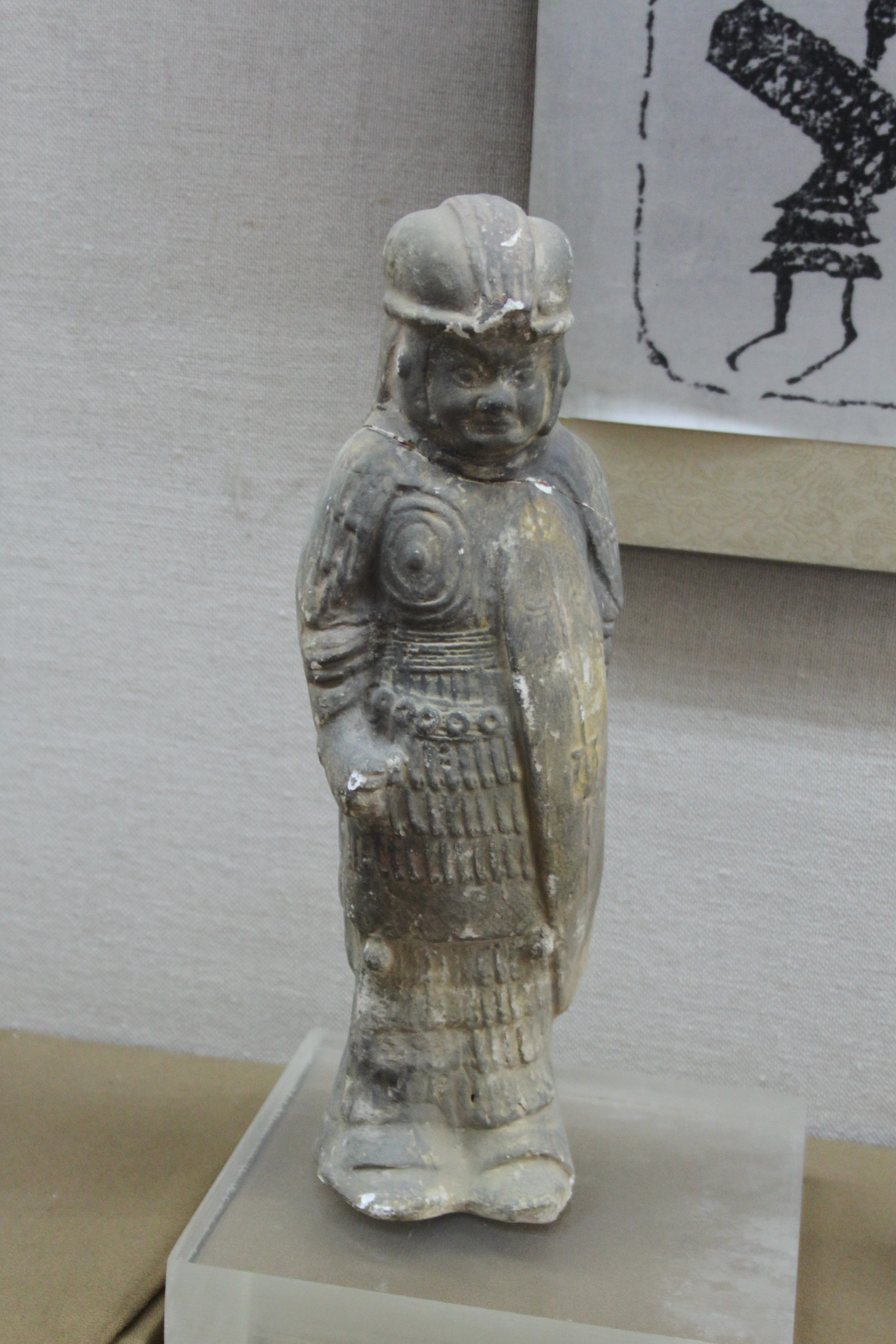
Sui soldier

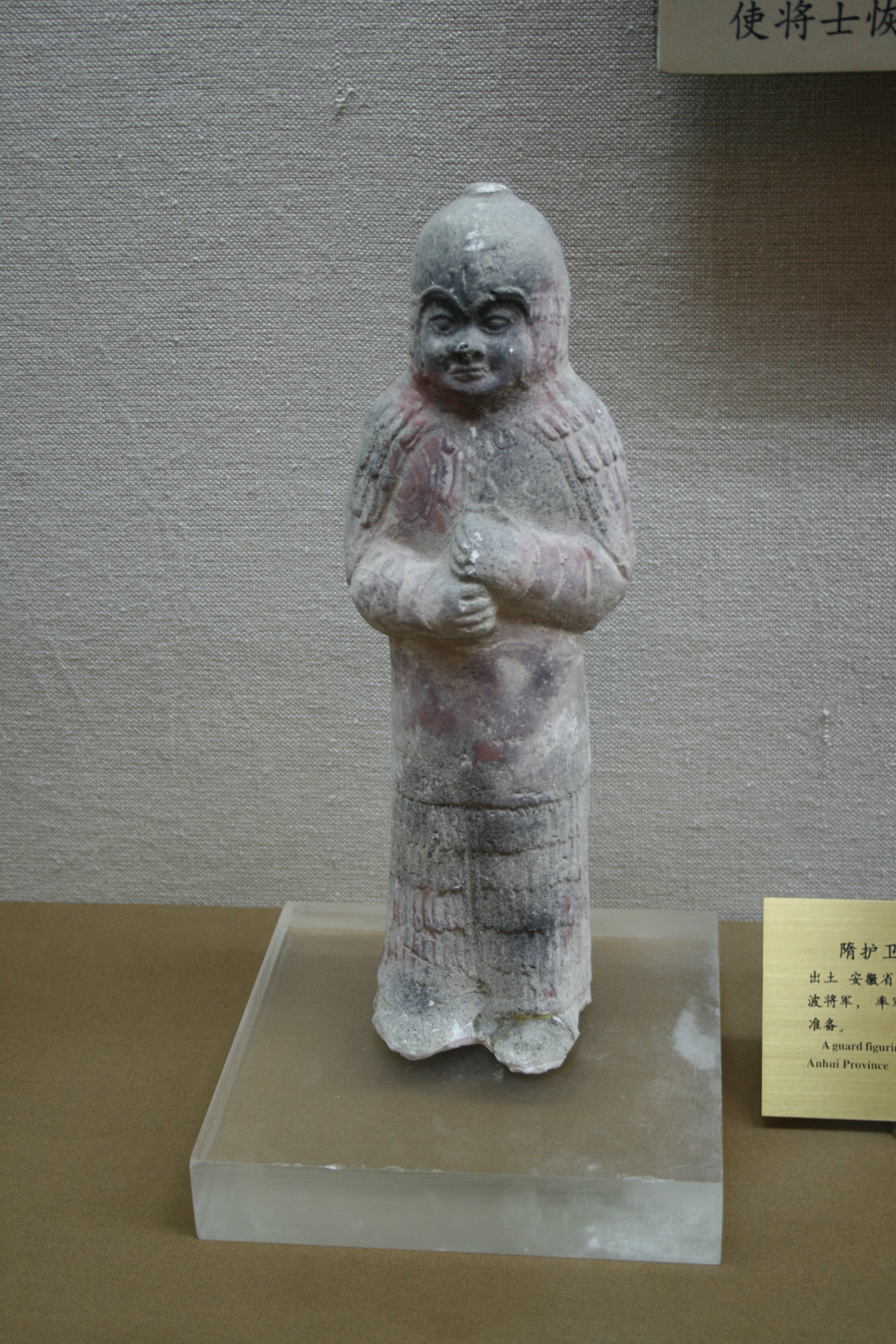
Sui soldier

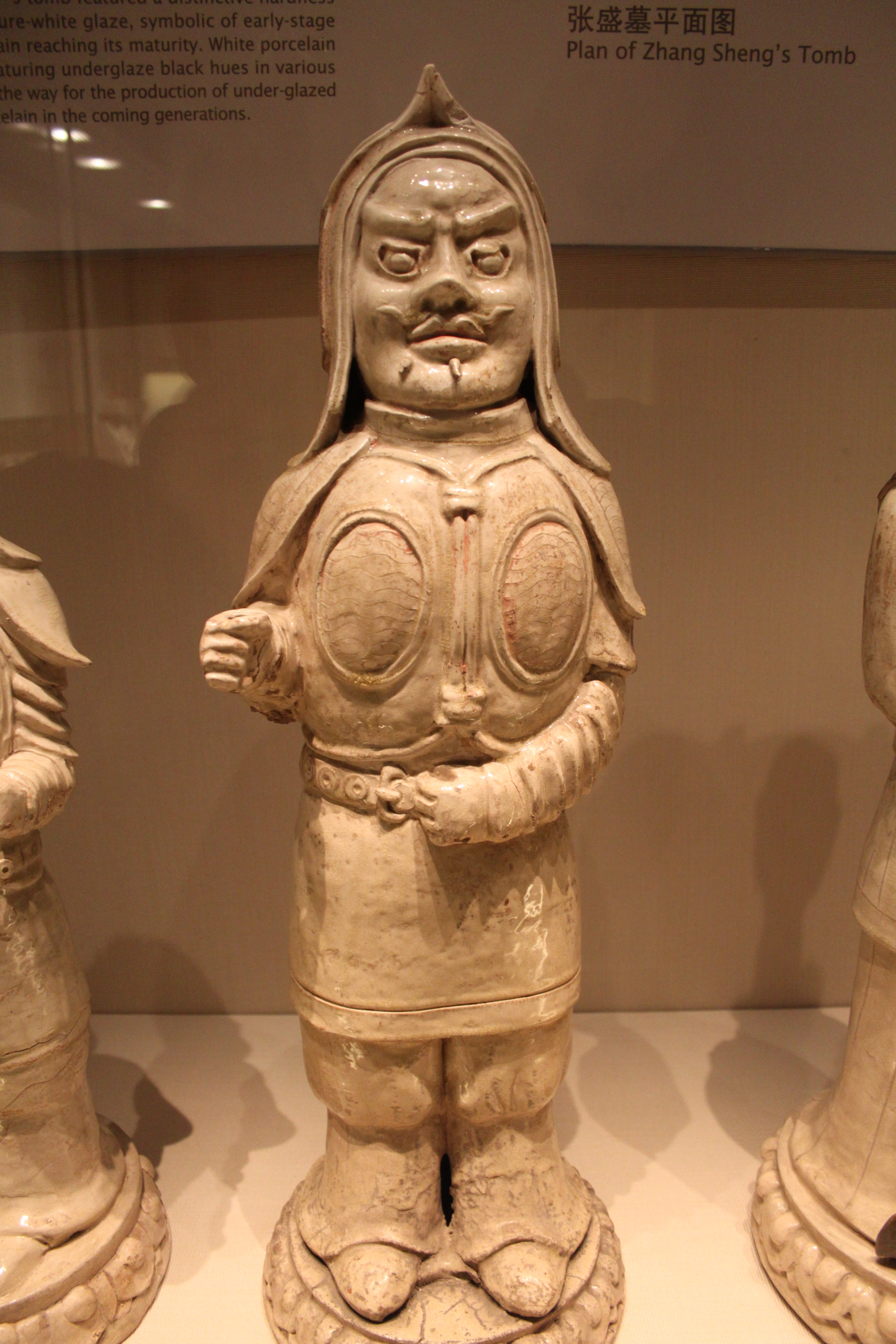
Sui pottery soldier

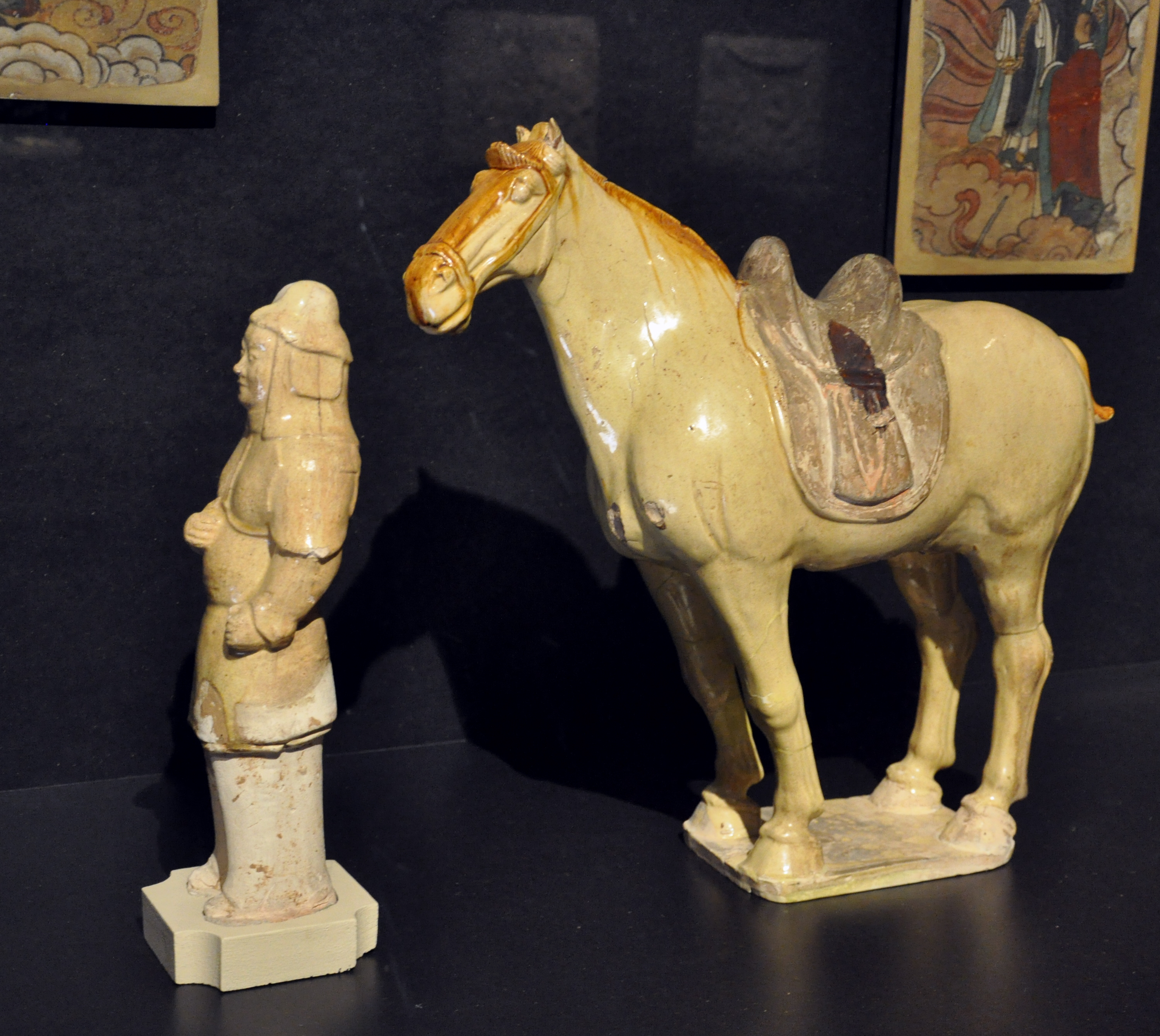
Sui cavalry

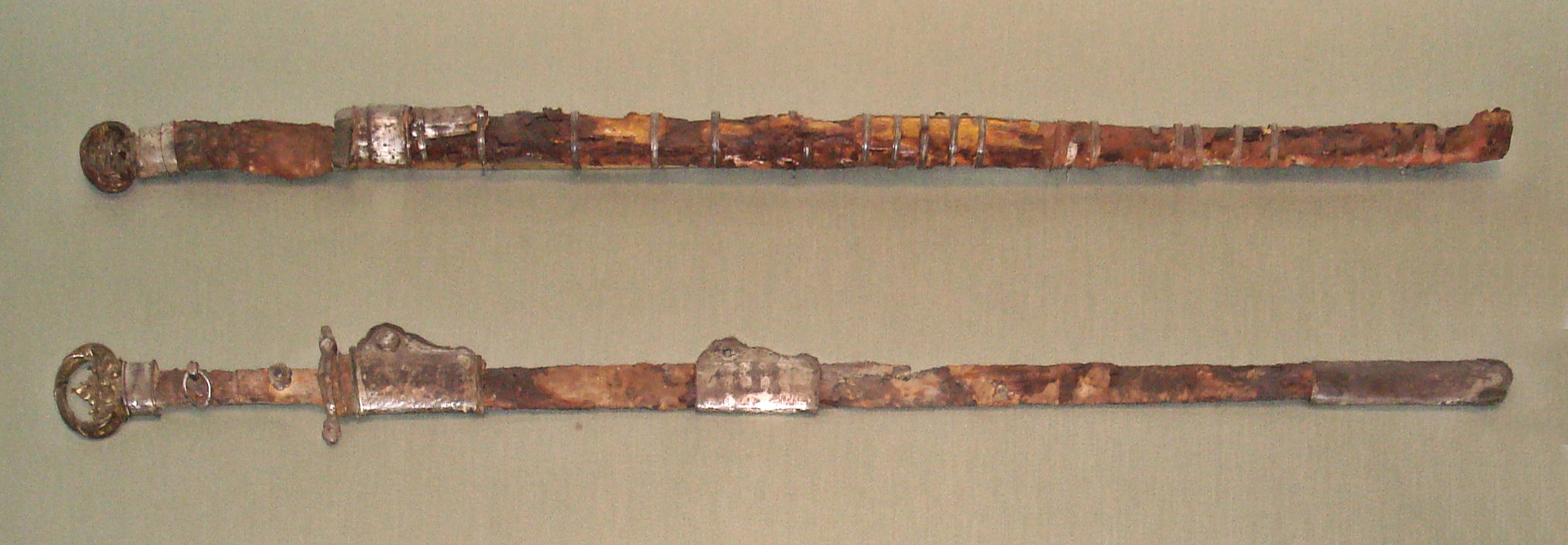
Sui swords

== Campaigns and battles ==
=== Emperor Wen of Sui (581–604) ===
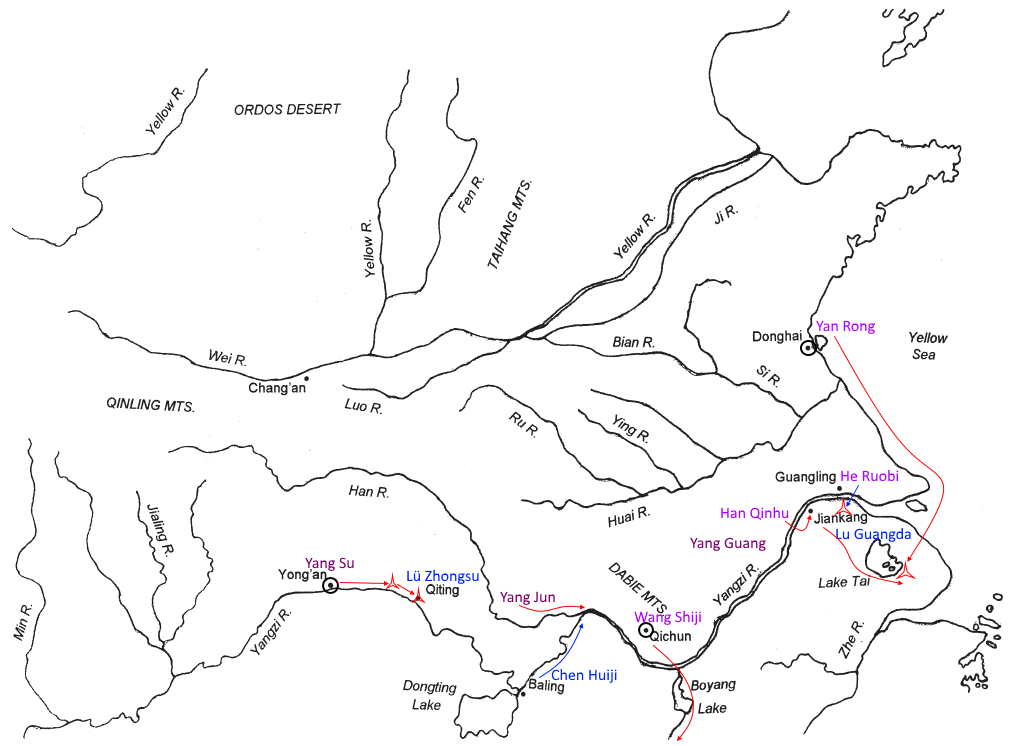
Sui conquest of Chen, 588-589

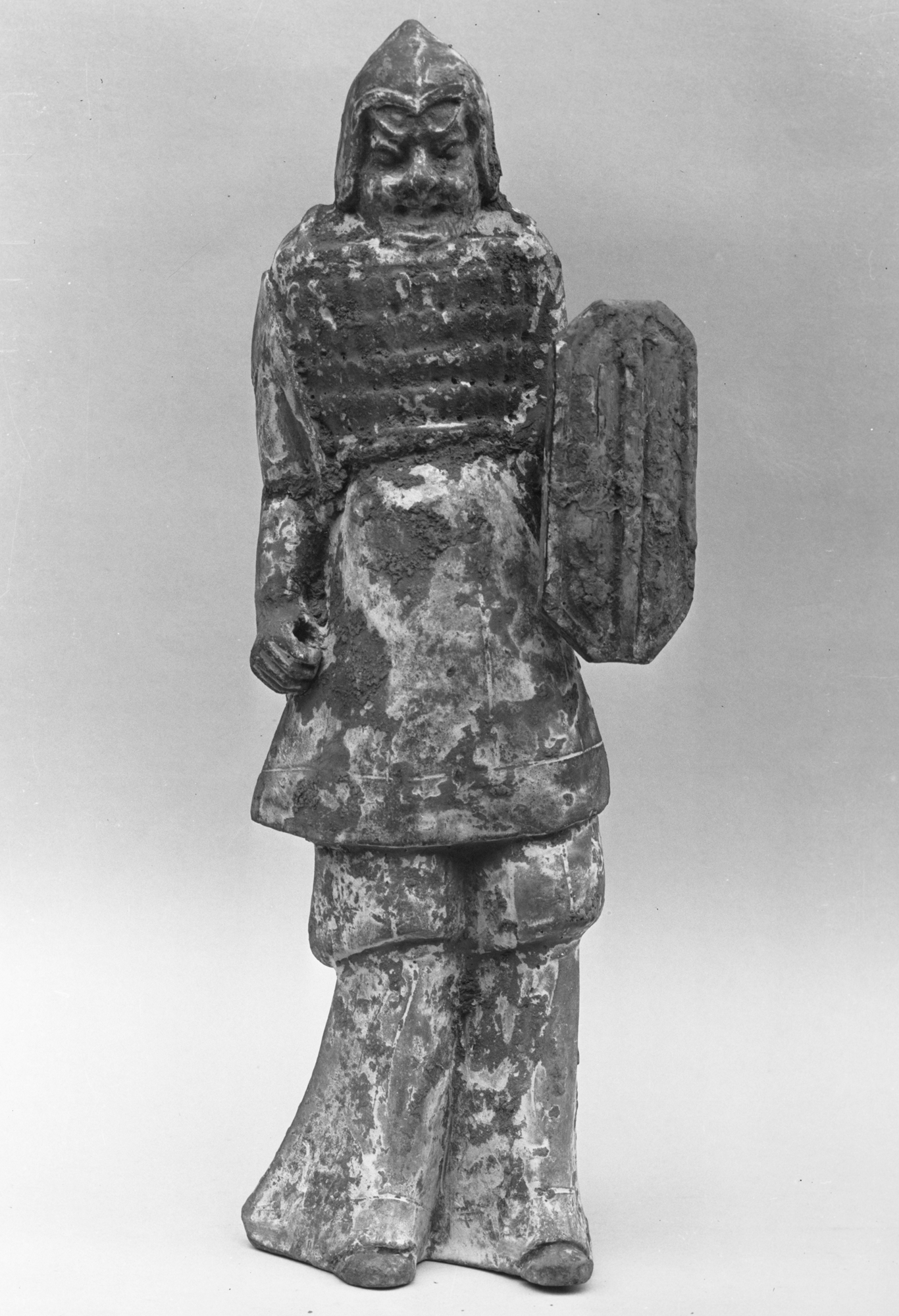
Chinese soldier holding a shield, 6th century

On 4 March 581, Yang Jian deposed Yuwen Chan, and declared himself Emperor of the Sui dynasty.

==== 1st Göktürks (582–585) ====
In 582, Ishbara Qaghan raided the Wei River valley and made off with large amounts of livestock.

In 585, Ishbara Qaghan was defeated by Sui forces at the Baidao Pass, near modern Hohhot. In the summer the Türks returned and killed the Sui commander in Youzhou.

==== Western Liang (587) ====
In 587, the Sui dynasty annexed Western Liang and began preparations for an invasion of the Chen dynasty.

==== Chen dynasty (588–589) ====
War vessels were built in Donghai Commandery, Qichun, and Yong'an. The largest ships were the Five-Banner ships that had five decks and were capable of accommodating 800 men. They were armed with six 50-foot-long, spike-bearing booms, that could be dropped vertically onto enemy vessels to pin them down for missile fire. The second largest class were known as Yellow Dragons and could carry 100 men each. Other smaller crafts also existed.

By the late fall of 588, the Sui dynasty had marshaled three fleets and five armies along the Changjiang, in total some 518,000 men. The Chen dynasty had perhaps 100,000 men. In the winter, Yang Su led his fleet downstream from Yong'an. They encountered at Wolf Tail's rapids a Chen fleet of 100 Green Dragon ships with support from several thousand men in palisade forts on north and south banks. Yang Su waited until night time before launching a three pronged attack on the Chen position. He himself took a large portion of the fleet past the palisades while two land columns attacked the palisades. The attack was a success and all the Chen troops were taken prisoner. Further downstream at Qiting, the Chen general Lü Zhongsu had stretched three iron chains across the river. The initial Sui offensives were met with failure and suffered some 5,000 casualties. Finally a night attack succeeded in overcoming the Chen defenses and the chains were removed. Lü Zhongsu fled with his fleet to Yan Island beneath Mount Jingmen, but the Sui sent four Five-Banner ships and chased them down. Using the spiked booms, the Sui ships were able to destroy a dozen Chen vessels, leading to the surrender of the Chen fleet.

Chen commander Chen Huiji tried to bring 30,000 men down the Changjiang but was blocked by Yang Jun at the confluence of the Han River.

On 22 January 589, Sui commander Heruo Bi crossed the Changjiang from Guangling with 8,000 men. The move came as a complete surprise to Chen forces on the southern bank due to a series of deceptions by Heruo Bi involving pretending to rotate soldiers and conducting practice hunts. The Chen forces could not stop the crossing since the majority of their fleet was concentrated at Jiankang. Heruo took Jingkou on 27 January. Meanwhile, a crack force of 500 men under Han Qinhu slipped across the Changjiang upstream of Jiankang and captured Caishi. They were then reinforced with 20,000 men. On 10 February 589, a Chen army met with Heruo's forces east of Jiankang, but of the five contingents, only one under Lu Guangda was willing to attack Heruo. Heruo was pushed back and his army suffered 273 casualties. Seeing that the situation was turning against him, Heruo set fire to the grass and escaped under cover of smoke. He then attacked another Chen division and routed it. The defeat reverberated throughout the entire Chen army, causing a general rout. While the battle was taking place, Han Qinhu approached Jiankang, which surrendered without a fight. General Yang Guang had the Chen ruler write letters of submission for his generals to follow, which most of them did. Wang Shiji's fleet moved south from Qichun to receive their surrender.

I met the armies that opposed me on the way to Jiankang and not only did I defeat them but I made prisoner one of the very distinguished and brave Chen commanders. It was really through me that the victory over Jiankang was gained, because of the courage of my men, the enemy was so terror struck that resistance was abandoned. And so your greatness rules the whole of the Great Realm.

— Heruo Bi to Emperor Wen of Sui

The only commander to offer any significant resistance was the governor of Wu Commandery. He was defeated by a two pronged attack from overland by Yang Guang and oversea by Yan Rong.

In late 590, a large rebellion occurred at Lake Tai in response to rumors that the Sui government was planning on relocating hundreds of thousands of northerners to the north. The rebellion spread south all the way to present-day Vietnam. However the rebel forces suffered several defeats to Yang Su and his commander Shi Wansui. The rebellion was eventually ended when Yang Su persuaded one of the two primary rebel leaders to turn on his colleague and hand him over to the Sui in return for his own life.

==== Demobilization ====
On 16 June, 590, it was decreed that the Twenty-four Armies would be demobilized and registered under the Equal-field system.

On 12 April 595, it was decreed that all weapons in the empire and any southern boat longer than 30 feet would be confiscated.

==== Cuanman (593–602) ====
In 593, the Cuanman rebelled in Yunnan. A punitive expedition was launched in 597 and the Cuanman were defeated in 602.

==== 1st Goguryeo (598) ====
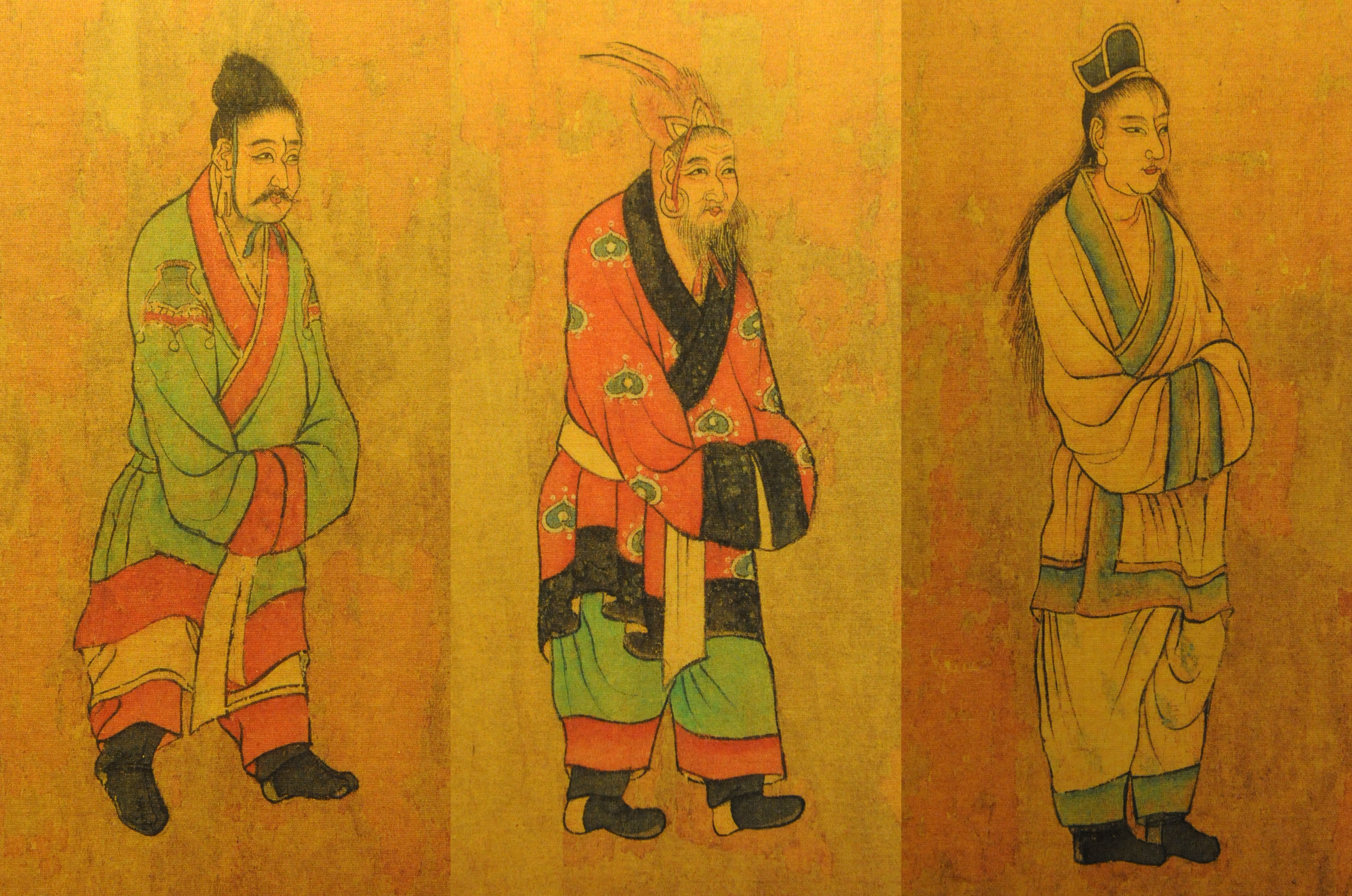
Tributary envoys from Baekje, Goguryeo, and Silla. Painting produced 7th century AD by Yan Liben (c. 600–673).

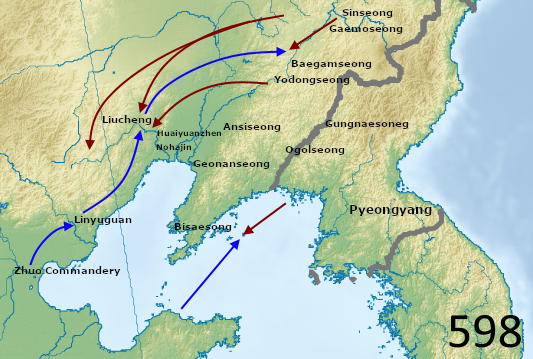
1st Goguryeo-Sui War, 598

In early 598, Goguryeo and the Mohe people raided Sui territory. The Sui retaliated with a 300,000 strong army on 4 August. Due to torrential rains, food shortage, and sickness, the army withdrew in October. A waterborne invasion from Shandong encountered storms and lost many of its vessels.

==== 2nd Göktürks (599) ====
In 599, Tardu attacked the Sui dynasty but was defeated by Yang Su.

==== Early Lý dynasty (602) ====
In 602, Sui forces under Liu Fang annexed the Kingdom of Vạn Xuân ruled by the Early Lý dynasty.

=== Emperor Yang of Sui (604–618) ===
==== Champa (605) ====
In 605, Sui forces under Liu Fang invaded Champa. The Cham army fielded elephants against the Sui army. Liu Fang had his soldiers dug pits and covered them with grass. When the elephants blundered into them while chasing a feigned flight, the Sui forces turned around and shot the elephants with crossbows. The elephants stampeded into the Chams and routed their own army. Liu Fang went on to sack the Cham capital but died from disease on the way back.

==== Tuyuhun (608) ====
In 608, Sui forces defeat the Tuyuhun, a people of mixed Xianbei and Qiang descent in modern Qinghai Province.

==== 2nd Goguryeo (612) ====
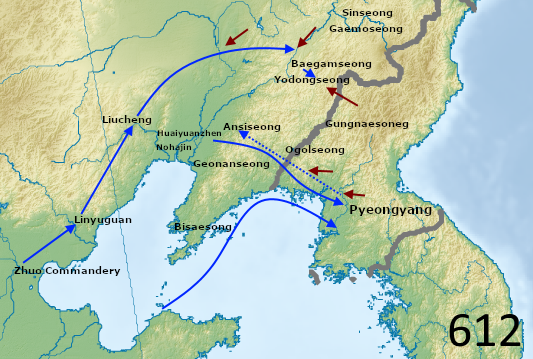
2nd Goguryeo-Sui War, 612

Emperor Yang of Sui began preparations for a campaign against Goguryeo in 610 when he imposed a new tax on wealthy families to purchase horses for his army. He officially announced the expedition on 14 April 611. Three hundred seagoing vessels were constructed in Donglai and 10,000 marines were transferred from the southern river systems to crew them. In addition to the regular forces, 30,000 javelin-men were recruited from Lingnan and 30,000 crossbowmen as well. On 1 June, the emperor arrived in Zhuo Commandery, south of modern Beijing. Connecting this location to the Huai River was the Yongji canal, which allowed the buildup of military materiel. Craftsmen in were ordered to construct 50,000 carts to transport clothing, armour, and tents. Some 600,000 men were mobilized to move wheelbarrows of grain northeast of Zhuo Commandery. According to the History of Sui, the combined 30 armies gathered for the expedition numbered 1,133,800 combat troops, and another two million serving in logistical capacity. David Graff gives a reduced estimate of 600,000 for the land forces and another 70,000 for the fleet.

On 8 February 612, the vanguard began their march for Goguryeo. They reached the Liao River on 19 April. The Sui army made two attempts to cross the river before succeeding and defeated the Goguryeo army arrayed before them. Emperor Yang besieged Ryotongseong (near modern Liaoyang). Meanwhile, the Sui fleet under Lai Huer set sail from Donglai and entered the Taedong River, arriving near Pyeongyang by the middle of July. They defeated a Goguryeo force and laid siege to Pyeongyang with 40,000 men. The defenders feigned flight, luring the invaders past the outer walls into an ambush, and drove them back to their ships with heavy losses. Lai remained on the coast for the rest of the campaign.

The fortress of Ryotongseong had not fallen and the siege was taking too long, so Emperor Yang sent nine of the thirty armies ahead with 100 days' supply of grain. However, by the time they had reached the Yalu River, most of the provisions had been spent. Some of the soldiers stored the grain underground because they could not bare the burden. One of the army commanders, Yuwen Shu, suggested that they retreat, but Yu Zhongsheng, who was in overall command refused. Eventually they were forced to retreat due to lack of provisions, but as the nine armies were crossing the Sa River, a strong attack by Goguryeo inflicted immense casualties on the units remaining on the southern bank.

Your brilliant plans expose reality.
Your subtle understandings encompass the world
You win all the battles; you are invincible.
Why not accept victory and end this war?

— Ŭlchi Mundŏk to Yu Zhongsheng

On 27 August, Emperor Yang received news of the defeat and called off the campaign.

==== 3rd Goguryeo (613) ====
On 28 January 613, Emperor Yang of Sui ordered a new army to be gathered at Zhuo Commandery. The new army crossed the Liao River on 21 May and laid siege to Ryotonseong while another column attacked Sinseong (near modern Fushun). Yuwen Shu and Yang Yichen attacked Pyeongyang. On 20 July, news of a rebellion by Yang Xuanguan at Liyang reached Emperor Yang, forcing him to withdraw.

==== Yang Xuanguan (613) ====
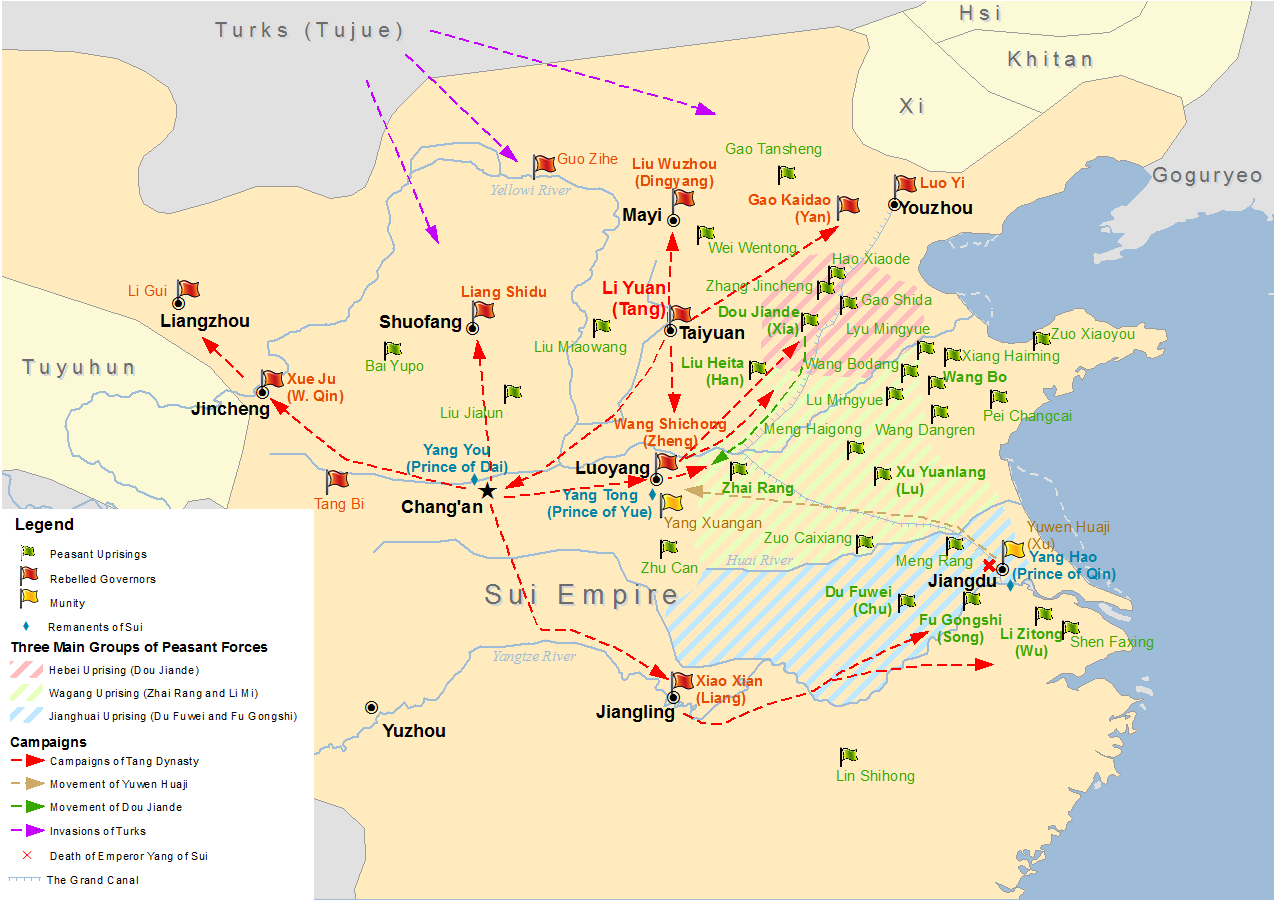
Transition from Sui to Tang (613–628)

On 25 June 613, Yang Xuangan rebelled in Liyang. He laid siege to Luoyang for several weeks before giving up and fleeing further west where he was killed by Sui forces.

==== 4th Goguryeo (614) ====
On 4 April 614, Emperor Yang of Sui ordered a new campaign against Goguryeo. The new army arrived on the Liao River on 27 August but failed to make any headway against the border fortresses. Lai Huer crossed the Bohai Sea and defeated a Goguryeo army. Yeongyang of Goguryeo sued for peace and Emperor Yang declared victory, withdrawing across the Liao.

==== 3rd Göktürks (615) ====
In the summer of 615, Emperor Yang of Sui was surrounded at Yanmen Commandery by Shibi Khan, but managed to escape after machinations at the Göktürk court caused them to retreat.

== Transition from Sui to Tang ==
After failing to defeat Goguryeo several times over, the Sui dynasty erupted into war among several competing factions. By the summer of 618, there emerged nine major contenders for power. Among them Li Yuan became the winner who founded the Tang dynasty (618–907).

- Dou Jiande, "King of Changle/Xia", who occupied central Hebei
- Du Fuwei, occupied the region between the Huai River and the Changjiang
- Li Mi, "Duke of Wei", who occupied Henan
- Li Yuan, "Emperor of Tang", who occupied Taiyuan and Chang'an
- Liang Shidu, "Emperor of Liang", who occupied Shuofang Commandery
- Liu Wuzhou, who occupied Mayi Commandery
- Wang Shichong, who occupied Luoyang
- Xiao Xian, "Emperor of Liang", who occupied the region south of the Changjiang
- Xue Ju, "Hegemon King of Western Qin", who occupied eastern Gansu

== Bibliography ==
- Graff, David A. (2002), Medieval Chinese Warfare, 300-900, Routledge
- Peers, C.J. (2006), Soldiers of the Dragon: Chinese Armies 1500 BC - AD 1840, Osprey Publishing Ltd
- Romane, Julian (2018), Rise of the Tang Dynasty
- Xiong, Victor Cunrui (2009), Historical Dictionary of Medieval China, United States of America: Scarecrow Press, Inc., ISBN 978-0810860537
- Yang, Bin (2008a), "Chapter 3: Military Campaigns against Yunnan: A Cross-Regional Analysis", Between Winds and Clouds: The Making of Yunnan (Second Century BCE to Twentieth Century CE), Columbia University Press
- Twitchett, Denis (1979), The Cambridge History of China 3-1
