= Caohe =

Caohe may refer to the following locations in China:

- Caohe Township (曹河乡), Huaiyang County, Henan
- Caohe Subdistrict (草河街道), Fengcheng, Liaoning

Towns

All are written as "漕河镇":

- Caohe, Xushui County, Hebei
- Caohe, Qichun County, in Qichun County, Hubei
- Caohe, Yanzhou, in Yanzhou, Shandong
