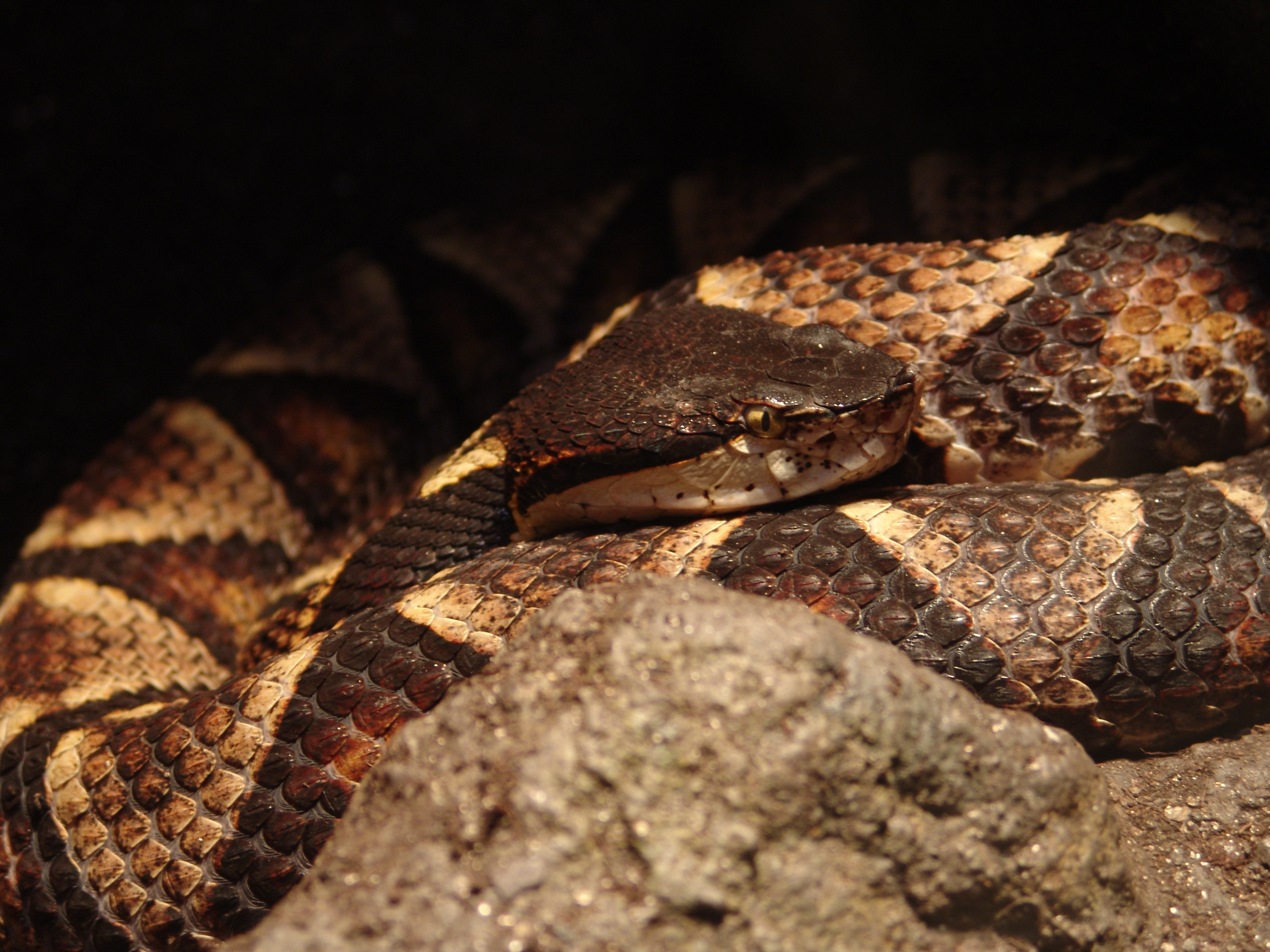

Conservation status
- Vulnerable (IUCN 3.1)

Scientific classification
- Kingdom: Animalia
- Phylum: Chordata
- Class: Reptilia
- Order: Squamata
- Suborder: Serpentes
- Family: Viperidae
- Subfamily: Crotalinae
- Genus: Deinagkistrodon; Gloyd, 1979
- Species: D. acutus

Binomial name
- Deinagkistrodon acutus (Günther, 1888)

Synonyms
- Agkistrodon Palisot de Beauvois, 1799; Halys Fabricius, 1803; Ancistrodon Wagler, 1830; Deinagkistrodon Gloyd, 1979; Halys acutus Günther, 1888; Ancistrodon acutus — Boulenger, 1896; Agkistrodon acutus — Namiye, 1908; Calloselasma acutus — Burger, 1971; Deinagkistrodon acutus — Gloyd, 1979

= Deinagkistrodon =

Genus of snakes

Deinagkistrodon is a monotypic genus created for the pit viper species, Deinagkistrodon acutus, which is endemic to Southeast Asia. No subspecies are currently recognized.

== Description ==
Deinagkistrodon acutus is light brown or greyish brown dorsally, with a series of dark brown lateral triangles on each side. The two pointed tops of the two opposite triangles meet each other at the mid-line, forming a series of about 20 light brown, squarish blotches on the back. A row of large black spots extends along each side near the belly. The top and upper sides of the head are uniformly black, with a black streak from the eye to the angle of the mouth. D. acutus is yellowish ventrally, spotted with dark brown. The young are much lighter than the adults with essentially the same pattern. The head is large, triangular, with an upturned snout. The body is very stout. The tail is short, ending in a compressed, pointed slightly curved cornified scale. The top of the head is covered with nine large shields. The dorsal scales are strongly and tubercularly keeled. The subcaudals are mostly in pairs, some of the anterior ones are single. This stout snake, usually between 0.8 and 1.0 metre (2.6 and 3.3 ft) in total length (including tail), reaches a maximum total length of 1.57 metres (5.2 ft) in males and 1.41 metres (4.6 ft) in females. The largest specimen on record measured approximately 1.549 metres (5.08 ft).

== Common names ==
Common names for D. acutus include sharp-nosed viper, snorkel viper, hundred pacer, Chinese moccasin, Chinese copperhead, five-pacer, hundred-pace snake, long-nosed pit viper, sharp-nosed pit viper, hundred-pace pit viper.

== In culture ==
The snake has been an object of veneration by indigenous Taiwanese peoples.

The Paiwan believe it as the parent of their hero Aljis who saved them from famine and taught them agriculture; he transforms into a mountain hawk-eagle after his work is done and gives them his feathers in memory which their chiefs have worn since. The viper (vulung) also adorns their homes as a symbol of power.

In Rukai legend, a hundred pacer saved the life of a tribal leader. In return, the leader named the viper palrata, meaning "our companion". The vipers were henceforth treated as Rukai warriors and companions of the tribe. Patterns and totems of hundred pacers are reserved for tribal leaders.

== Geographic range ==
Deinagkistrodon acutus is found in southern China (Zhejiang, Fujian, Hunan, Hubei, Guangdong), Taiwan, northern Vietnam, and possibly Laos. The type locality was not included in the original description. It was later given as "Wusueh [Wuxue], Hupeh [Hubei] Province, China" by Pratt (1892) and Pope (1935). Listed as "Mountains N. of Kiu Kiang [Jiujiang]" in the catalogue of the British Museum of Natural History.

== Habitat ==
The species D. acutus inhabits high, forested mountains up to 1,350 metres (4,430 ft), but has also been found in low coastal regions (100 metres (330 ft)). It prefers lower mountain slopes or rocky hills with small valleys.

== Diet ==
The diet of D. acutus consists of small mammals such as rats and mice, birds, toads, frogs and lizards. Chinese herpetologist Zhao Ermi reported a specimen of a total length of 1.04 metres (3.4 ft) and weighing 600 grams (1.3 lb) having eaten a specimen of Rattus rattus of a total length of 51.5 centimetres (20.3 in) and a weight of 530 grams (1.17 lb).

== Reproduction ==
As one of the few oviparous pit vipers, D. acutus can lay up to 24 eggs, which may be retained during initial incubation, an adaptation that shortens post-deposition incubation time. However, it generally only deposits 11 or 12 eggs from June to August. Egg size is 40–56 x 20–31 mm (about 2 × 1 in). Hatchlings are lighter and more vividly patterned than the adults, but this darkens considerably with age.

== Venom ==
Dangerous animals often have exaggerated reputations and the species D. acutus is no exception. The popular name "hundred pacer" refers to a local belief that, after being bitten, the victim will only be able to walk 100 steps before dying. In some areas, it has even been called the "fifty pacer" or, in extreme examples, the "five-step snake". This often causes bite victims to needlessly amputate or burn bitten fingers or limbs, resulting in further complications like the loss of the amputated body part or gangrene. Nevertheless, this species is considered dangerous, and fatalities are not unusual. An antivenom is produced in Taiwan.

Brown (1973) mentions a venom yield of up to 214 mg (dried) and LD_{50} (toxicity) values of 0.04 mg/kg IV, 4.0 mg/kg IP and 9.2–10.0 mg/kg SC. The venom contains at least four hemorrhagins Acutolysin A, B, C and D.

According to the US Armed Forces Pest Management Board, the venom is a potent hemotoxin that is strongly hemorrhagic. Bite symptoms include severe local pain and bleeding that may begin almost immediately. This is followed by considerable swelling, blistering, necrosis, and ulceration. Systemic symptoms, which often include heart palpitations, may occur suddenly and relatively soon after the bite. Because of its body size and large hinged fangs which permit effective delivery of large quantities of venom, victims bitten by this snake should be treated accordingly.

=== Venom use in research and medicine ===
The venom of this species is commonly used for research purposes. Researchers have found that this venom contains protease activity, meaning it attacks and degrades intra- and extracellular proteins. If injected into mice, within 2 hours the venom begins a process known as mesangiolysis (the degeneration and death of cells that line the inner layer of the glomerulus and regulate glomerular filtration in the kidney). Eventually, the kidneys no longer function and the mouse dies.

When controlled, the venom has some clinical application. D. acutus snake venom contains a protein called ACTX-6. This protein was shown to induce apoptosis (cell death) in isolated cancer cells through Fas pathway activation. Fas is a protein that becomes a death receptor in the cellular membrane. When activated, Fas turns on what is called a "caspase cascade". This pathway is made up of a series of proteins called initiator and executioner caspases. Initiator caspases help form an apoptosis initiation factor that eventually activates executioner caspases (see figure 3). Executioner caspases go on to "digest" the cell from the inside out. They cleave cytoskeleton filaments and DNA until the cell completely implodes.

=== Venom and traditional Chinese medicine ===
Deinagkistrodon acutus venom has been used in traditional Chinese medicine for centuries to extract antivenin that is successfully used to treat snakebites. Different parts of the snake are also prescribed to help alleviate ailments known as "wind diseases". Because these snakes move so quickly, substances from their bodies are thought to easily treat these fast-moving "wind" syndromes. D. acutus is currently used in patients with arthritis, leprosy, tetanus, boils, and, as previously mentioned, tumors. The same qualities that make snakes flexible, capable of regenerating skin, and able to inflict paralysis could be transferred to human conditions if applied medicinally. The vipers are prepared by cooking the flesh of the headless body, grinding a paste of snake ash and mixing it with honey, drying the snake and compacting it into a powder, or even injecting their venom intravenously. Although these practices are common in Chinese medicine, no current studies have affirmed the effectiveness of these treatments. Whether these "cures" simply have a placebo effect or actually heal the patients is not known.
