= Twelve Armies =

The Twelve Armies (Chinese: 十二軍; pinyin: shíèrjūn) refer to a group of garrisons under the fubing system of the Sui dynasty. The Twelve Armies of the Tang dynasty were created in 620 by transforming the Twelve Military Circuits (Chinese: 十二道; pinyin: shíèrdào) created in 618. The Twelve Armies were suspended from 623 to 625 and were dissolved in 636 when the fubing system underwent reorganization.

The Twelve Armies were named:

- Army of the Celestial Lion's Pelt (Chinese: 參旗軍; pinyin: shēnqíjūn)
- Army of the Celestial Herdboy (Chinese: 鼓旗軍; pinyin: gǔqíjūn)
- Army of the Celestial Black Lance (Chinese: 玄戈軍; pinyin: xuángējūn)
- Army of the Celestial Twins (Chinese: 井鉞軍; pinyin: jǐngyuèjūn)
- Army of the Celestial Water Bearer (Chinese: 羽林軍; pinyin: yǔlínjūn)
- Army of the Celestial Wolf (Chinese: 騎官軍; pinyin: qíguānjūn)
- Fear-proof Army (Chinese: 折威軍; pinyin: zhéwēijūn)
- Army of the Celestial Cornucopia (Chinese: 平道軍; pinyin: píngdàojūn)
- Army of the Great Celestial Bear (Chinese: 招搖軍; pinyin: zhāoyáojūn)
- Army of the Celestial Parks and Gardens (Chinese: 苑遊軍; pinyin: Yuànyóujūn)
- Army of the Celestial Serpent (Chinese: 天紀軍; pinyin: tiānjǐjūn)
- Army of the Celestial Bull (Chinese: 天節軍; pinyin: tiānjiéjūn)

== Bibliography ==
- Hucker, Charles O. (1985), A Dictionary of Official Titles in Imperial China, Stanford University Press
