= Yongxi =

Yongxi may refer to:

== Locations ==
- Yongxi, Chongqing, Dazu District, China
- Yongxi Township, Guizhou (涌溪乡), a township in Zhenyuan County, Guizhou, China
- Yongxi Township, Zhejiang (泳溪乡), a township in Tiantai County, Zhejiang, China
- Yongxi Subdistrict (雍熙街道), a subdistrict in Nayong County, Guizhou, China
- Yongxi, a village in Meichuan, Wuxue, Huanggang, Hubei

== Historical eras ==
- Yongxi (永憙, 144–145), era name used by Emperor Chong of Han
- Yongxi (永熙, 290), era name used by Emperor Hui of Jin
- Yongxi (永熙, 532–535), era name used by Emperor Xiaowu of Northern Wei
- Yongxi (雍熙, 984–987), era name used by Emperor Taizong of Song
