= Li Shizhen =

Chinese physician and pharmacologist (1517–1593)

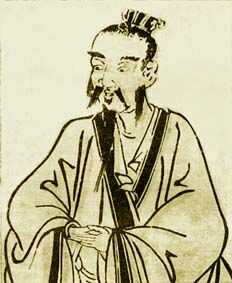
- An illustration of Li Shizhen
- Born: 3 July 1518; Qizhou Town, Qichun County, Hubei, Ming China
- Died: 1593 (aged 74–75)
- Other name: Dongbi (東璧)
- Occupations: Acupuncturist, herbalist, naturalist, pharmacologist, physician, writer
- Father: Li Yanwen

Li Shizhen
- Traditional Chinese: 李時珍
- Simplified Chinese: 李时珍
Transcriptions
Standard Mandarin
- Hanyu Pinyin: Lǐ Shízhēn
- Wade–Giles: Li Shih-chen

Li Shizhen (3 July 1518 – 1593), courtesy name Dongbi, was a Chinese acupuncturist, herbalist, naturalist, pharmacologist, physician, and writer of the Ming dynasty. He is the author of a 27-year work, the Compendium of Materia Medica (Bencao Gangmu; Chinese: 本草綱目). He developed several methods for classifying herb components and medications for treating diseases.

The Compendium is a pharmacology text with 1,892 entries, with details about more than 1,800 traditional Chinese medicines, including 1,100 illustrations and 11,000 prescriptions. It also described the type, form, flavor, nature and application in disease treatments of 1,094 herbs. The book has been translated into several languages. The treatise included various related subjects such as botany, zoology, mineralogy, and metallurgy. Five original editions still exist.

== Life ==
In addition to Compendium of Materia Medica, Li Shizhen wrote eleven other books, including Binhu Maixue (Pin-hu Mai-hsueh; 瀕湖脈學; "A Study of the Pulse") and Qijing Bamai Kao (Chi-ching Pa-mai Kao; 奇經八脈考; "An Examination of the Eight Extra Meridians"). He lived during the Ming dynasty and was influenced by the Neo-Confucian beliefs of the time. He was born in what is today Qizhou, Qichun County, Hubei on 3 July 1518, AD. As a child, Li suffered from an eye disease that was supposedly caused by an overconsumption of peppercorn seeds.

Li Shizhen's grandfather was a doctor who traveled the countryside and was considered relatively low on the social scale of the time. His father was a traditional physician and scholar who had written several influential books. He encouraged his son to seek a government position. Li took the national civil service exam three times, but after failing each one, he turned to medicine. At 78, his father took him on as an apprentice. When he was 38, and a practicing physician, he cured the son of the Prince of Chu and was invited to be an official there. A few years after, he got a government position as assistant president at the Imperial Medical Institute in Beijing. However, even though he had climbed the social ladder, as his father had originally wanted, he left a year later to return to being a doctor.

In his government position, Li was able to read rare medical books. He began correcting some of the mistakes and conflicting information in these medical publications. He soon began the book Compendium of Materia Medica to compile correct information with a logical system of organization. A part was based on another book which had been written several hundred years earlier, Jingshi Zhenglei Beiji Bencao (Ching-hsih Cheng-lei Pei-chi Pen-tsao; "Classified Materia Medica for Emergencies") – which, unlike many other books, had formulas and recipes for most of the entries. In the writing of the Compendium of Materia Medica, he travelled, gaining first-hand experience with many herbs and local remedies and consulted over 800 books.

Altogether, the writing of Compendium of Materia Medica took 27 years, which included three revisions. Writing the book allegedly took a toll on his health. It was rumored that he stayed indoors for ten consecutive years during the writing of the Compendium of Materia Medica. After he had completed it, a friend "reported that Li was emaciated."

Li died before the book was officially published, and the Ming emperor at the time paid it little regard.

== Compendium of Materia Medica ==
Li's bibliography included nearly 900 books. Because of its size, it was not easy to use, which had classified herbs only according to strength. He broke them down to animal, mineral, and plant and divided those categories by their source. Dr. S. Y. Tan says: "his plants were classified according to the habitat, such as aquatic or rock origins, or by special characteristics, e.g. all sweet-smelling plants were grouped together."

With every entry, he included:

- "Information concerning a previously false classification;
- Information on secondary names, including the sources of the names;
- Collected explanations, commentaries and quotes in chronological order, including origin of the material, appearance, time of collection, medicinally useful parts, similarities with other medicinal materials;
- Information concerning the preparation of the material;
- Explanation of doubtful points;
- Correction of mistakes;
- Taste and nature;
- Enumeration of main indications;
- Explanation of the effects; and
- Enumeration of prescriptions in which the material is used, including form and dosage of the prescriptions."

Compendium of Materia Medica contained nearly 1,900 substances, which included 374 that had not appeared in other works. Not only did it list and describe the substances, but it also included prescriptions for use – about 11,000 - 8,000 of which were not well known. The Compendium of Materia Medica also had 1160 illustrated drawings to aid the text.

In addition to writing Compendium of Materia Medica, Li wrote about gallstones, using ice to bring down a fever, and using steam and fumigants to prevent the spread of infection. Li also emphasized preventative medicine. He said that "To cure disease is like waiting until one is thirsty before digging a well..." and listed over 500 treatments to maintain good health and strengthen the body, 50 of which he invented himself.

While only six copies of the original edition remain – one in the US Library of Congress, two in China, and three in Japan (a seventh copy in Berlin was destroyed during World War II) – several new editions and numerous translations have been made throughout the centuries. In 1959, it was replaced.

== Gallery ==
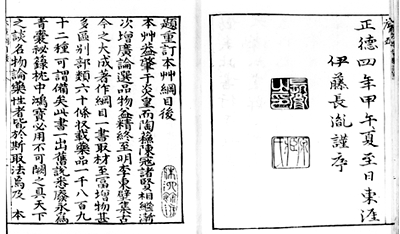
Compendium of Materia Medica is a pharmaceutical text written by Li Shizhen during the Ming dynasty of China.

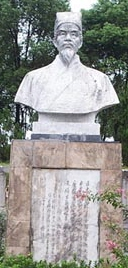
A bust of Li Shizhen in a herbal garden of Qizhou

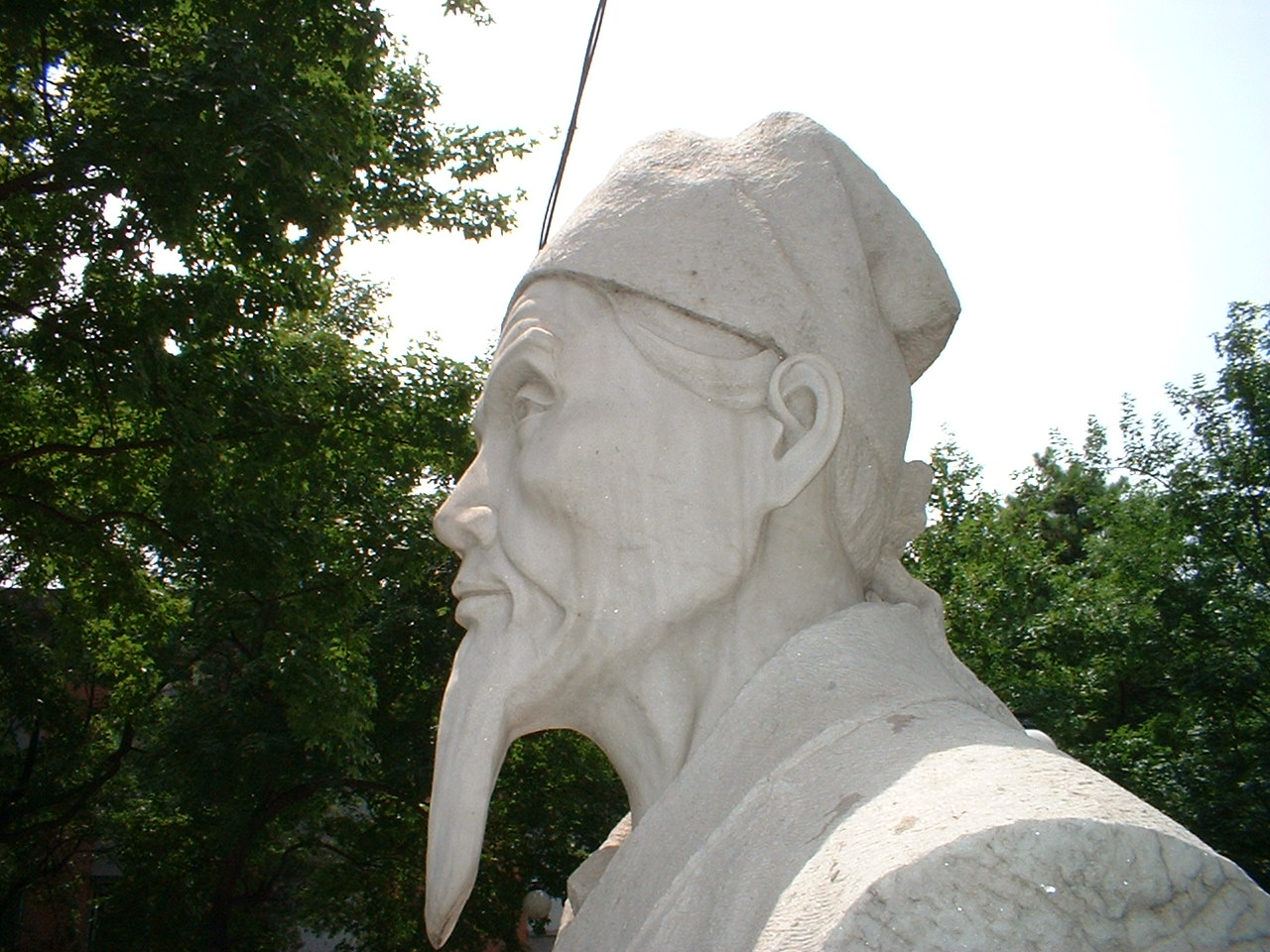
A statue of Li Shizhen found at Peking University Health Science Center

== See also ==
- Chinese herbology
- Traditional Chinese medicine
- Traditional Chinese medicines derived from the human body
