= Acutolysin A =

Toxin from snake venom

Acutolysin-A
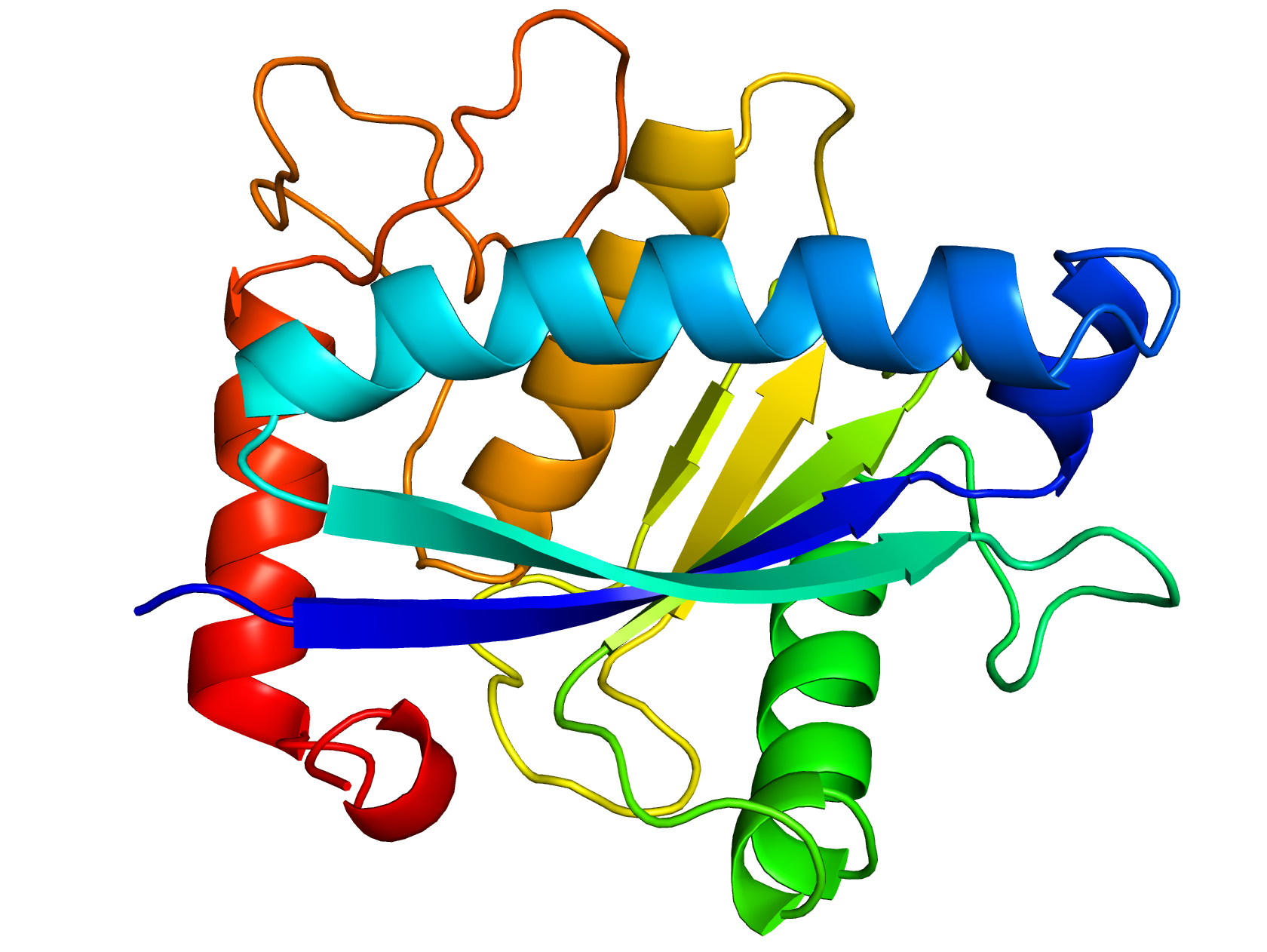
- Acutolysin A structure (rainbow colored, N-terminus blue, C-terminus red)

Identifiers
- Organism: Deinagkistrodon acutus
- Symbol: ?
- Orthologs: OMA: entry
- PDB: 1BUD
- UniProt: Q9PW35
Search for
- Structures: Swiss-model
- Domains: InterPro

Acutolysin A (also called AaH I) is a toxin found in the snake Agkistrodon acutus venom. It is a member of the adamalysin subfamily of the metzincin family and is a snake venom zinc metalloproteinase possessing only one catalytic domain. AaH I grows crystals under pH 5.0 and 7.5 conditions. AaH I has a single polypeptide chain and a molecular weight of 22 kDa.

== Structure ==
The overall fold of Acutolysin A is composed of a twisted β-sheet core flanked by α-helices, forming the characteristic metzincin architecture. Central to this fold is the conserved “Met-turn”, a methionine-containing structural motif that stabilizes the active-site configuration. The three disulfide bonds in AaH I (Cys117–Cys197, Cys159–Cys181, and Cys157–Cys164) are strategically positioned to maintain this fold under physiological conditions and to resist thermal or proteolytic degradation. These disulfide linkages play a crucial role in preserving the shape of the catalytic cleft, ensuring maximal enzymatic activity even in harsh extracellular environments. At the active site is the HELGHNLGLH metalloproteinase motif, which binds a catalytic zinc ion in a tetrahedral geometry. Three histidine residues coordinate the zinc atom, while the fourth ligand is either a water molecule or hydroxide ion, which acts as the nucleophile in peptide bond hydrolysis. The active-site cleft forms a deep groove that accommodates collagen and laminin fibers, aligning them precisely for cleavage. This structural arrangement explains the exceptional potency of AaH I in degrading basement membranes.

== Agkistrodon acutus Venom ==
Common names for this snake include sharp nosed viper, hundred pacer, and snorkel viper. This snake is a pit viper found in the mountains of South Asia. This snake is extremely venomous having a reputation where people can only walk one hundred steps before dying. It is not uncommon for fatalities after being bitten. Bite symptoms include severe local pain and bleeding that may begin almost immediately. This is followed by considerable swelling, blistering, necrosis, and ulceration. Systemic symptoms, which often include heart palpitations, may occur suddenly and relatively soon after the bite. This venom causes people to be forced to amputate limbs and well as mesangiolysis. Mesangiolysis is the process which affects the glomerular mesangium without causing obvious damage to the capillary basement membranes. It is the degeneration and killing of the cells that line the inner layer of the glomerulus, which regulates the globular filtration in the kidney. This causes the kidney to be unable to function, resulting in death. Two hours after the venom is injected into mice, it causes the mice to start mesangiolysis till their kidneys eventually stop working and they die. This venom contains various anticoagulant and hemorrhagic proteins that interfere with the coagulation process. There are four hemorrhagins (acutolysin A, acutolysin B, acutolysin C, and acutolysin D) with acutolysin A being the most portent hemorrhagic. There is a venom yield of up to 214 mg (dried) and [Median lethal dose|LD_{50}] values of 0.04 mg/kg IV, 4.0 mg/kg IP and 9.2–10.0 mg/kg SC.

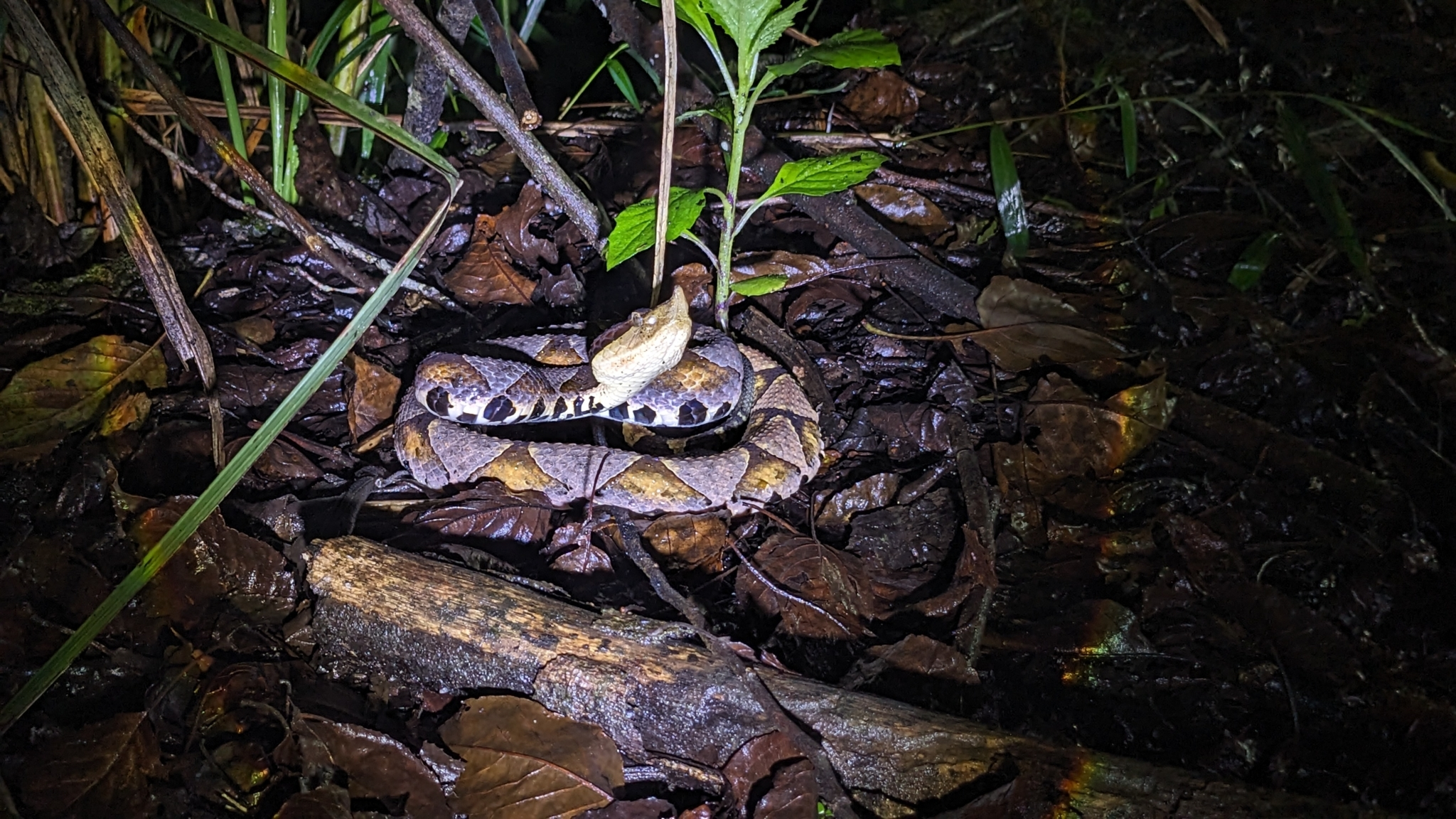
Agkistrodon acutus. Chinese Moccasin pit viper snake.

== Acutolysin A ==
AaH I is a hemorrhagic toxin which means it causes internal bleeding by damaging blood vessels. AaH I damages the walls of capillaries, causes them to leak blood internally, leading to death. Hemorrhagic toxins are common among other snake venoms as well like rattlesnakes and the western diamondback. There are four different types of AaH in Agkistrodon acutus venom, with AaH I being the strongest hemorrhagic one. Its proteolytic activity was sensitive to pH where it was 100 times stronger in weak alkaline conditions at pH 7.5. This is referring to the break down of proteins through the enzyme proteases. Aah I has three disulfide connections at Cys117-Cys197, Cys159-Cys181 and Cys157-Cys164. There is also one calcium ion, zinc ion, and three histidine zinc ligation in the structure. Each member of the metzincins has a zinc ion in its active site. Metzincins family is metalloproteinases that use a zinc ion in the enzymatic reaction. The zinc binding in AaH I is tetrahedral, three imidazole nitrogen atoms of histidine and one oxygen atom. It is unknown whether this oxygen atom is a water molecule or a hydroxide ion. A calcium ion occurs on the surface of the AaH I molecule opposite to the active-site cleft and close to the crossover point of the N-terminal and the C-terminal segment. Its position close to the C terminus, this calcium ion in the multi-domain parent structure could well play an important role in stabilizing and tightening the segment connecting the proteolytic domain with the succeeding disintegrin domain.

AaH I exerts its hemorrhagic and tissue-destructive effects primarily through its function as a zinc-dependent metalloproteinase specialized for degrading structural components of the extracellular matrix. The toxin targets the basement membrane of capillaries, which is composed largely of collagen type IV, laminin, nidogen, and heparan sulfate proteoglycans. These proteins form a scaffold that maintains capillary integrity. AaH I cleaves these ECM proteins with high efficiency, and because the toxin shows optimal activity near physiological pH, it functions extremely effectively in blood and tissue microenvironment. The active site of AaH I contains the conserved metalloproteinase motif HELGHNLGLH, where three histidine residues coordinate a catalytic zinc ion. The zinc ion polarizes a bound water molecule, allowing it to act as a potent nucleophile that attacks peptide bonds in substrate proteins. This hydrolytic attack directly destroys the structural proteins that hold endothelial cells in place, leading to rapid disruption of capillary walls. Within minutes of exposure, endothelial cells detach from their underlying basement membrane, causing vascular leakage, red blood cell extravasation, and local hemorrhage.

In addition to basement membrane breakdown, AaH I induces endothelial cell apoptosis. This is not due to direct cytotoxicity but is a secondary effect of losing the cell’s structural anchoring to the ECM, a process known as anoikis. Once endothelial cells detach, capillaries become fragile and prone to rupture under normal blood pressure. This effect explains the extremely rapid onset of local bleeding seen in victims of Agkistrodon acutus bites. AaH I also indirectly enhances hemorrhage by interfering with platelet aggregation, because ECM fragments generated by proteolysis prevent platelets from binding properly to the injury site. This prolongs bleeding and contributes to systemic effects such as hypotension and organ ischemia. When the toxin reaches the kidneys, its proteolytic activity contributes to mesangiolysis, where the supporting mesangial cells of the glomerulus detach and die, ultimately leading to renal failure.

== Venom comparison ==
Each snake that has venom contains various haemorrhagins that cause the hemorrhage and damage of living tissues. Majority of snake venoms contain the zinc metalloproteinase like AaH I. These zinc metallproteinase have similar active sites to matrix metallproteimase which are responsible for degrading proteins of the extracellular matrix. Snake venom metallproteinase are able to work on collagen in connective tissues. Which means they are a part of the MMP super-family and help design drugs for anti-tumor and anti-arthritis. Because of this, they are great for learning more about the mechanisms of ligand-receptor interaction and cell-cell interaction. The agkistrodon acutus venom in particular contains a protein called ACTX-6 which can induce apoptosis. Apoptosis is forced cell death through morphological changes that lead to death. There are multiple ways that cells naturally die this way. Agkistrodon acutus venom can induce this cell death in cancer cells through the Fas pathway activation. Fas is a receptor for death in cells that when turned on will cause a caspase cascade. Which is a pathway made up of series of proteins called initiator and executioner caspases. Where initiator caspases help form apoptosis initiation factor that eventually activates executioner caspases. Executioner caspases procedure to eat the cell from the inside out by cleaving cytoskeleton filaments and DNA until the cell implodes.
