= Fubing system =

Chinese militia system (6th–8th centuries AD)

The fubing system (Chinese: 府兵制; pinyin: fǔbīng zhì; Wade–Giles: fu-ping chih) was a local militia system in Imperial China from the 6th to 8th centuries AD, originating in the Western Wei dynasty and subsequently adopted by the Northern Zhou, Sui, and Tang dynasties.

== Characteristics ==
The basis of the Sui and early Tang militaries was the fubing militia system, first employed by the Western Wei, under regent Yuwen Tai's administration. These militia units also served as reserves, and could be mobilized quickly in times of war or political instability. Those over 2000 li away served for two months every 18 months. When off-duty, they would farm their land, but when a war occurred, they would be re-mobilized. This supplemented the equal-field system, which assigned all households a share of land to farm. These units subsequently became hereditary military families, and ushered forth vast militarized settlements and communities.

The Sui placed these units under local civil administration, and later the Tang incorporated them under metropolitan control, more specifically the Ministry of the Army. The Tang fielded 634 militia units, later called Zhechongfu. Under Tang administration every 6 families were expected to provide one man to serve under a garrison unit. Each unit consisted of 800 to 1200 men, and in turn were subdivided into tuan of 300, dui of 50, and huo of 10. Many were concentrated in the northern region, especially in Guanzhong, which alone fielded 261 militia units, the rest included 164 in Shanxi, and 74 in Henan and Shandong, all constituting about 80 percent of fubing conscripts. Fubing required little government expenditure, since militiamen could support themselves by farming.

The fubing system only had provisions for brief military campaigns and peacetime. Prolonged warfare would prevent the cultivation of agriculture for the economy. Fubing was gradually abandoned in favor of full-time army units, known as jian'er (健儿).

== See also ==
- Military history of the Northern and Southern dynasties
- Military history of the Sui dynasty
- Military history of the Tang dynasty
- Weisuo system, a similar local militia system used by the Ming dynasty
