= Meichuan, Wuxue =

Meichuan 梅川镇
- Town
- Location in Hubei
- Coordinates: 30°07′35″N 115°36′07″E
- Country: People's Republic of China
- Province: Hubei
- Prefecture-level city: Huanggang
- County-level city: Wuxue
- Time zone: UTC+8 (China Standard)

Meichuan (Chinese: 梅川; pinyin: Méichuān; lit. 'plum river') is a town under the administration of the county-level city of Wuxue in extreme eastern Hubei province, China. It lies at the north of the Wuxue city, and was once the administrative center of Guangji County, the predecessor of Wuxue city. Meichuan Reservoir, Meichuan River and some of the south branch of Dabie Mountains locate in Meichuan. Meichuan's main industry includes rice planting, rapeseed planting, beer industry, etc. It is well known for its yam cultivation and production. The most important school in Meichuan is Meichuan Senior High School, which has a history of over 100 years.

== Geography ==
=== Administrative divisions ===
As of 2016, Meichuan administered:

NBS Area No.	Name (Mand.)	Chinese (Simp.)
Communities
421182100002	Chenghuangmiao City God Temple	城隍庙社区
421182100003	Zhenxing	振兴社区
421182100004	Sangziyuan	桑梓园社区
421182100005	Meipu	梅浦社区
421182100006	Shiniu	石牛社区
421182100008	Jugang	居杠社区
Villages
421182100200	Congzheng	从政村
421182100203	Lingshan	灵山村
421182100204	Yangwan	杨塆村
421182100205	Wulipo	五里坡村
421182100206	Wangsheng	王胜村
421182100207	Baishi	白石村
421182100208	Zhanghuan	张焕村
421182100209	Xiacheng	下程村
421182100210	Tonggu	铜鼓村
421182100211	Shilipu	十里铺村
421182100212	Lixingsi	李兴泗村
421182100213	Luolin	罗林村
421182100214	Baofa	包法村
421182100215	Qiaotou	桥头村
421182100216	Kunlong	困龙村
421182100217	Zouma	走马村
421182100218	Fanbaishu	范柏树下村
~~421182100219~~	~~Ruanjiaxiang~~	阮家巷村
421182100220	Fanyingyou	范应佑村
421182100221	Wufuqi	吴伏七村
421182100222	Yongxi	永西村
421182100223	Huzheng	胡政村
421182100224	Wanglei	王埒村
421182100225	Jienianzi	解念兹村
421182100226	Luzizhen	卢子珍村
421182100227	Jiejinpo	解金坡村
421182100228	Lüxingzu	吕兴祖村
421182100229	Luquan’er	鲁全二村
421182100230	Tashuiqiao	塔水桥村
421182100231	Lishan	栗山村
421182100232	Huli	胡立村
421182100233	Yangpu	杨铺村
421182100234	Chenfulu	陈福禄村
421182100235	Sihe	思河村
~~421182100236~~	~~Zhangsiji~~	张思济村
421182100237	Chaji	插箕村
421182100238	Ganshannao	干山垴村
421182100239	Wufan	吴畈村
~~421182100240~~	~~Shiniu~~	石牛村
421182100241	Shichuan	石船村
421182100242	X/Jienao	解垴村
421182100243	Liyun’er	李云二村
421182100244	Xianrenkou	仙人口村
421182100245	Nan	南村
421182100246	Songlin	宋林村
421182100247	Shouyi	受益村
421182100248	Zhaojun	赵俊村
421182100249	Yueshan	岳山村
421182100250	Guotan	郭坦村
421182100251	Wuda	吴大村
421182100252	Songchong	宋冲村
421182100253	Heyelin	荷叶林村
421182100254	Lulin	绿林村
421182100255	Fengkou	峰口村
421182100256	Tongxin	同心村
421182100257	Xiazhao	下赵村
421182100258	Guanshan	观山村
421182100259	Quankou	泉口村
421182100260	Changlingcun	长岭村
421182100261	Zhangdexian	张德先村
421182100262	Wanggui	王贵村
421182100263	Zhangpai	张牌村
421182100264	Juwensheng	居文胜村
421182100265	Malong	马垅村
421182100266	Shanghao	上郝村
421182100267	Taosi	陶斯村
421182100268	Fanghong	方洪村
~~421182100269~~	~~Jugang~~	居杠村
421182100270	Liuchang	刘昌村
421182100271	Raoweishi	饶为市村
421182100272	Cailin	蔡林村
421182100273	Pangudang	盘古垱村
421182100274	Hudaozhang	胡导章村
421182100275	Lüsifang	吕四房村
421182100276	Xialiu	夏柳村
421182100277	Siguta	司古塔村
421182100278	Huilong	回垅村
421182100279	Ruanjialang	阮家廊村
421182100280	Siji	思济村
