= Qi Prefecture (Hubei) =

Historical administrative division in Hubei, China

Qizhou
- Traditional Chinese: 蘄州
- Simplified Chinese: 蕲州
- Postal: Kichow
Transcriptions
Standard Mandarin
- Hanyu Pinyin: Qízhōu
- Wade–Giles: Ch'i^{2}-chou^{1}

Qizhou or Qi Prefecture (蘄州) was a zhou (prefecture) in imperial China centering on modern Qichun County, Huanggang, Hubei, China. In the Yuan dynasty and Ming dynasty it was known as Qizhou Prefecture (蘄州路 or 蘄州府). It existed from the 6th century until 1912.
