= Qichun County =

Qichun County 蕲春县 Kitsun
- County
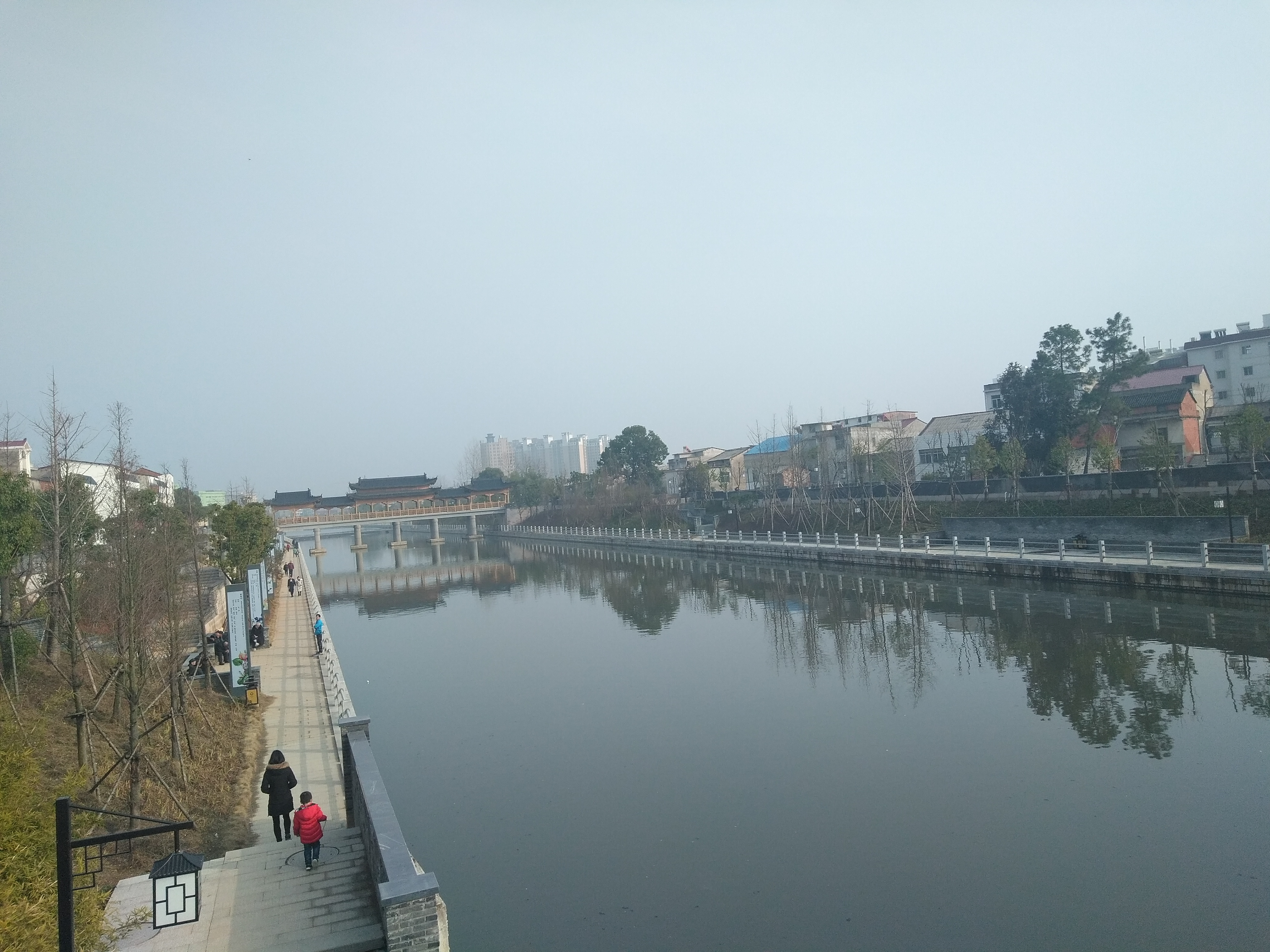
- A bridge over a river in Qichun County

- Location of the seat in Hubei
- Coordinates (Qichun government): 30°13′34″N 115°26′13″E
- Country: People's Republic of China
- Province: Hubei
- Prefecture-level city: Huanggang

Area
  - Total: 2,397.6 km^{2} (925.7 sq mi)

Population (2020)
  - Total: 792,101
  - Density: 330.37/km^{2} (855.66/sq mi)
- Time zone: UTC+8 (China Standard)
- Website: 蕲春县人民政府门户网站 (Qichun County People's Government Web Portal) (in Simplified Chinese)

Qichun County (simplified Chinese: 蕲春县; traditional Chinese: 蘄春縣; pinyin: Qíchūn Xiàn) is a county of eastern Hubei province, People's Republic of China. It is under the administration of Huanggang City.

Qichun County has been a major historical center of traditional Chinese medicine. It is known in China as the "Professor County" (Chinese: 教授县; pinyin: Jiàoshòu Xiàn), due to the high amount of professors and other academic experts hailing from the county.

== Toponymy ==
Qichun County is named after the abundant qicai (Chinese: 蕲菜; pinyin: qí cài), a variety of Chinese celery, in the area.

== History ==
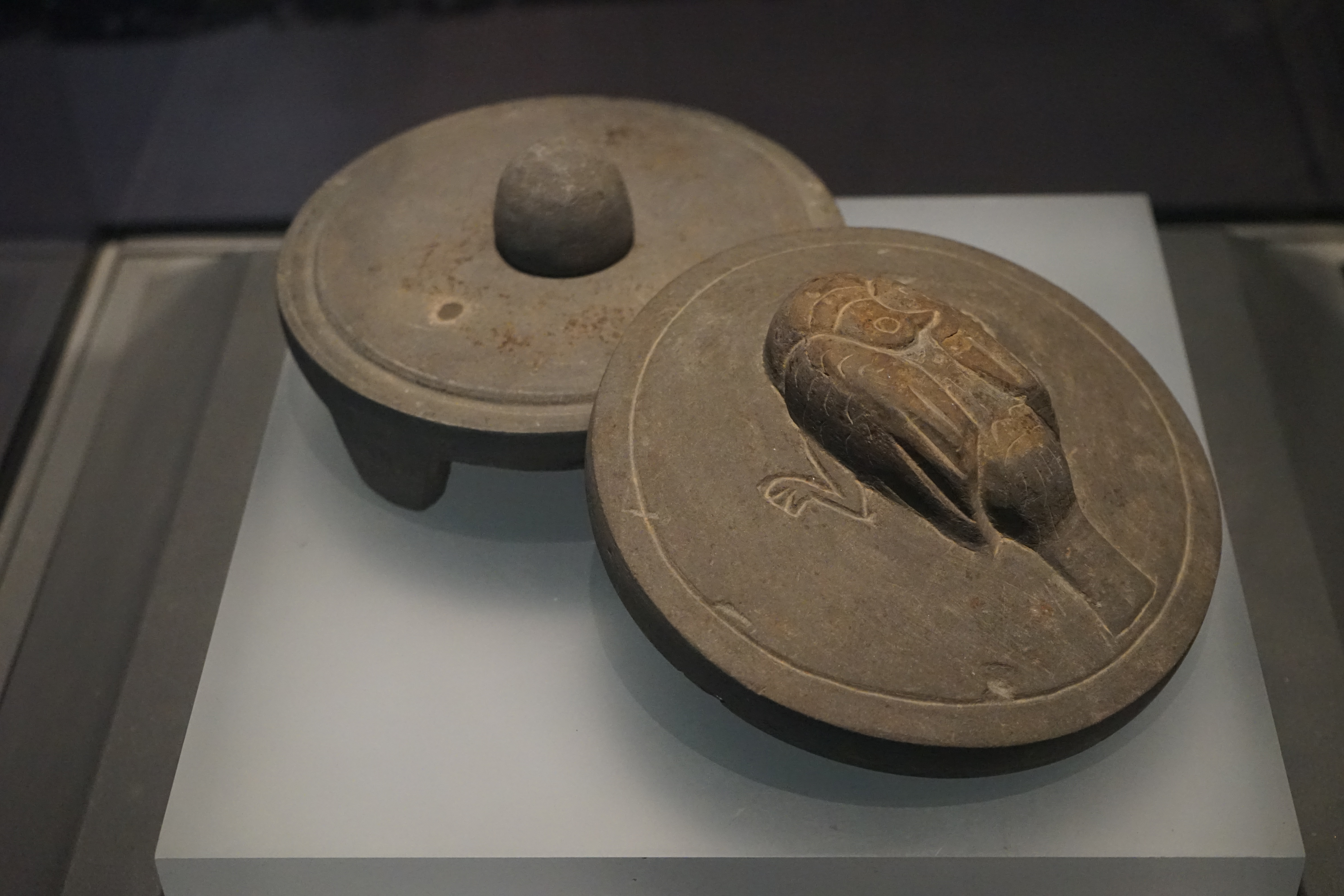
Inkstone with three legs and a bird cover. Eastern Han dynasty. Excavated at Ganyuzui tomb, Qichun.

The area of present-day Qichun County has been inhabited since the Neolithic age.

In 224 BCE, Qin forces pursued the beaten and retreating Chu forces to Qinan (蕲南; northwest of present-day Qichun in Hubei) and general Xiang Yan, grandfather of future hegemonic king Xiang Yu, was either killed in the action or committed suicide following his decisive defeat.

Qichun County was first established during the Western Han, possibly as early as 201 BCE. Due to its strategic location, in history Qichun was referred to as “The Key Point of Jingchu” (Jingchu is another name of the ancient state of Chu and the region belonged to it).

=== Three Kingdoms period ===
During the Three Kingdoms period, Qichun was made a commandery (Chinese: 郡; pinyin: Jùn). In the summer of 223 CE, Eastern Wu general He Qi attacked and eliminated an outpost of Cao Wei in the new commandery territory of Qichun, on the southern slopes of the Dabie Shan mountains. But for the next twelve months the northern front remained quiet. The Grand Administrator of Qichun was Jin Zong, a former officer of Sun Quan who had deserted and joined Cao Wei. It appears he was given the commandery appointment at this time, in the hill country of the Dabie Shan on the border region between Lujiang and Jiangxia, so that he could disturb the communications routes along the Yangtze and across that river to the south.

There is evidence that the Qichun commandery had been established a few years earlier, evidently on the basis of the county of that name in Jiangxia Commandery of Later Han, but the territory had been abandoned by Cao Cao at the time of his withdrawal in 213 CE. From this time, after the defeat of Jin Zong's infiltration, the territory was held by Wu. One of the subordinate commanders in He Qi's attack on Qichun was Mi Fang, the erstwhile officer of Guan Yu who had surrendered Jiangling to Lü Meng in 219 AD. Qichun also was evidently a proving ground for renegades.

=== Later history ===
During the Southern and Northern dynasties, the area became administered under the Qichang Commandery. During the Tang dynasty, the area was reorganized as a fu. Qichun would later be reverted to a county.

During the Song dynasty, Qichun County was home to an extraordinarily large market for traditional Chinese medicine, which poet Lu You described as 40 li long.

Prince Jing's Mansion (Chinese: 荆王府; pinyin: Jīng Wángfǔ) was constructed in Qichun County during the Ming dynasty.

=== People's Republic of China ===
In 1949, Qichun County was placed under Huanggang Prefecture. In 1995, Huanggang was changed from a prefecture to a prefecture-level city.

== Geography ==
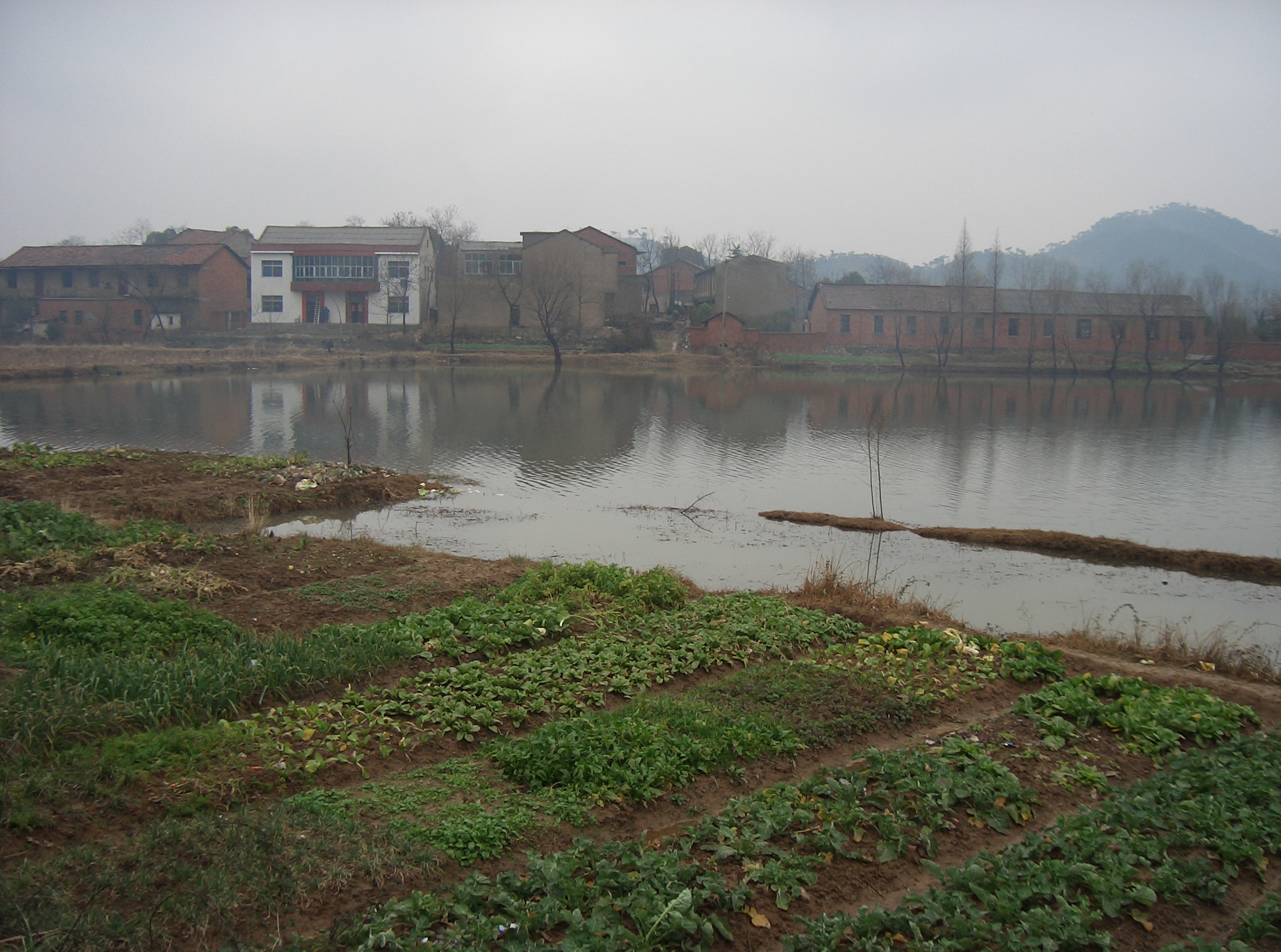
The Qichun countryside.

Qichun County is located in the east of Hubei, along the northern banks of the Yangtze, and at the southern foot of the Dabie Mountains. To its east is the province of Anhui. The county's government, seated in the town of Caohe, is located 96 kilometres (60 mi) from the center of Huanggang, and 157 kilometres (98 mi) from the center of Wuhan, capital of Hubei.

The total geographic area of Qichun County is 2,397.6 square kilometres (925.7 sq mi). Of this, 560 kilometres (350 mi) are arable. Water covers 310 kilometres (190 mi) (there are hundreds of lakes in Qichun County, almost all used for aquaculture). Forested areas cover 1,040 kilometres (650 mi).

(Note: While not stated in government data, unless there is a statistical error, the remaining 490 square kilometres (190 sq mi) must be hills/mountains, in the northern part of the county, or simply unusable land).

Qichun County's area is topographically diverse, with mountains, hills, and plains. The elevation decreases gradually from mountains of northeast to the lowlands of southwest. The Mount Sanjiao Scenic Area is located within the county.

Apart from the Yangtze, major bodies of water in Qichun County include the Qi River (Chinese: 蕲河; pinyin: Qí Hé), Lake Chidong, and Lake Chixi.

=== Climate ===
The local climate is classed as "subtropical mainland monsoon," with distinct seasons and abundant rainfall (average 134 centimeters per year). When the Yangtze River floods, Qichun County also experiences some flooding.

Climate data for Qichun, elevation 72 m (236 ft), (1991–2020 normals, extremes 1981–present)
Month	Jan	Feb	Mar	Apr	May	Jun	Jul	Aug	Sep	Oct	Nov	Dec	Year
Record high °C (°F)	22.1 (71.8)	27.3 (81.1)	34.0 (93.2)	33.7 (92.7)	36.3 (97.3)	38.3 (100.9)	40.6 (105.1)	41.2 (106.2)	38.9 (102.0)	35.7 (96.3)	30.8 (87.4)	24.1 (75.4)	41.2 (106.2)
Mean daily maximum °C (°F)	8.7 (47.7)	11.7 (53.1)	16.3 (61.3)	22.8 (73.0)	27.5 (81.5)	30.1 (86.2)	33.6 (92.5)	33.4 (92.1)	29.6 (85.3)	24.1 (75.4)	17.8 (64.0)	11.4 (52.5)	22.3 (72.1)
Daily mean °C (°F)	4.7 (40.5)	7.4 (45.3)	11.8 (53.2)	17.9 (64.2)	22.8 (73.0)	26.0 (78.8)	29.3 (84.7)	28.8 (83.8)	24.7 (76.5)	18.9 (66.0)	12.5 (54.5)	6.7 (44.1)	17.6 (63.7)
Mean daily minimum °C (°F)	1.8 (35.2)	4.2 (39.6)	8.2 (46.8)	14.0 (57.2)	19.0 (66.2)	22.7 (72.9)	26.0 (78.8)	25.4 (77.7)	21.1 (70.0)	15.1 (59.2)	8.9 (48.0)	3.3 (37.9)	14.1 (57.5)
Record low °C (°F)	−6.6 (20.1)	−5.4 (22.3)	−3.0 (26.6)	2.7 (36.9)	9.0 (48.2)	12.7 (54.9)	18.3 (64.9)	17.8 (64.0)	10.7 (51.3)	2.5 (36.5)	−1.7 (28.9)	−9.4 (15.1)	−9.4 (15.1)
Average precipitation mm (inches)	68.4 (2.69)	83.8 (3.30)	118.0 (4.65)	158.0 (6.22)	175.7 (6.92)	229.5 (9.04)	213.4 (8.40)	126.1 (4.96)	81.6 (3.21)	62.4 (2.46)	64.4 (2.54)	39.9 (1.57)	1,421.2 (55.96)
Average precipitation days (≥ 0.1 mm)	12.4	12.5	15.0	13.6	13.4	14.0	12.3	12.3	8.7	8.9	10.0	9.2	142.3
Average snowy days	3.7	2.1	0.6	0	0	0	0	0	0	0	0.1	1.0	7.5
Average relative humidity (%)	78	77	75	74	75	79	77	77	76	75	77	75	76
Mean monthly sunshine hours	98.8	100.4	129.3	157.6	181.9	168.1	225.9	226.6	186.0	166.9	141.9	127.5	1,910.9
Percentage possible sunshine	30	32	35	41	43	40	53	56	51	48	45	40	43
Source: China Meteorological Administration

== Administrative divisions ==
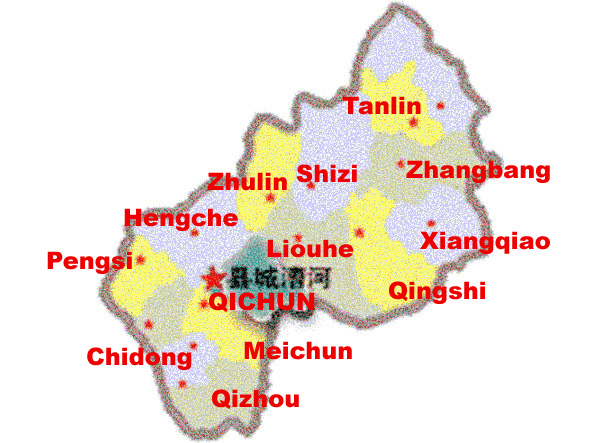
Qichun County Map (as of 2006), showing subdivision names

Qichun County administers the following 13 towns, 1 township, and 5 other township-level divisions:

Name	Chinese (S)	Etymology
Towns
Caohe	漕河镇	
Chidong	赤东镇	
Qizhou	蕲州镇	Qi Prefecture
Guanyao	管窑镇	
Hengche	横车镇	
Pengsi	彭思镇	
Zhulin	株林镇	
Liuhe	刘河镇	
Shizi	狮子镇	Lion
Qingshi	青石镇	
Zhangbang	张塝镇	
Tanlin	檀林镇	
Datong	大同镇	
Township
Xiangqiao Township	向桥乡	
Other township-level divisions
Balihu	八里湖	
Qichun Economic Development Zone	蕲春经济开发区管委会	
Li Shizhen Medicine Industrial Park	李时珍医药工业园区	Li Shizhen
Qichun Chilong Lake National Wetland Park	蕲春赤龙湖国家湿地公园	
Qichun County Xianrentai Tea Factory	蕲春县仙人台茶厂	

== Government ==
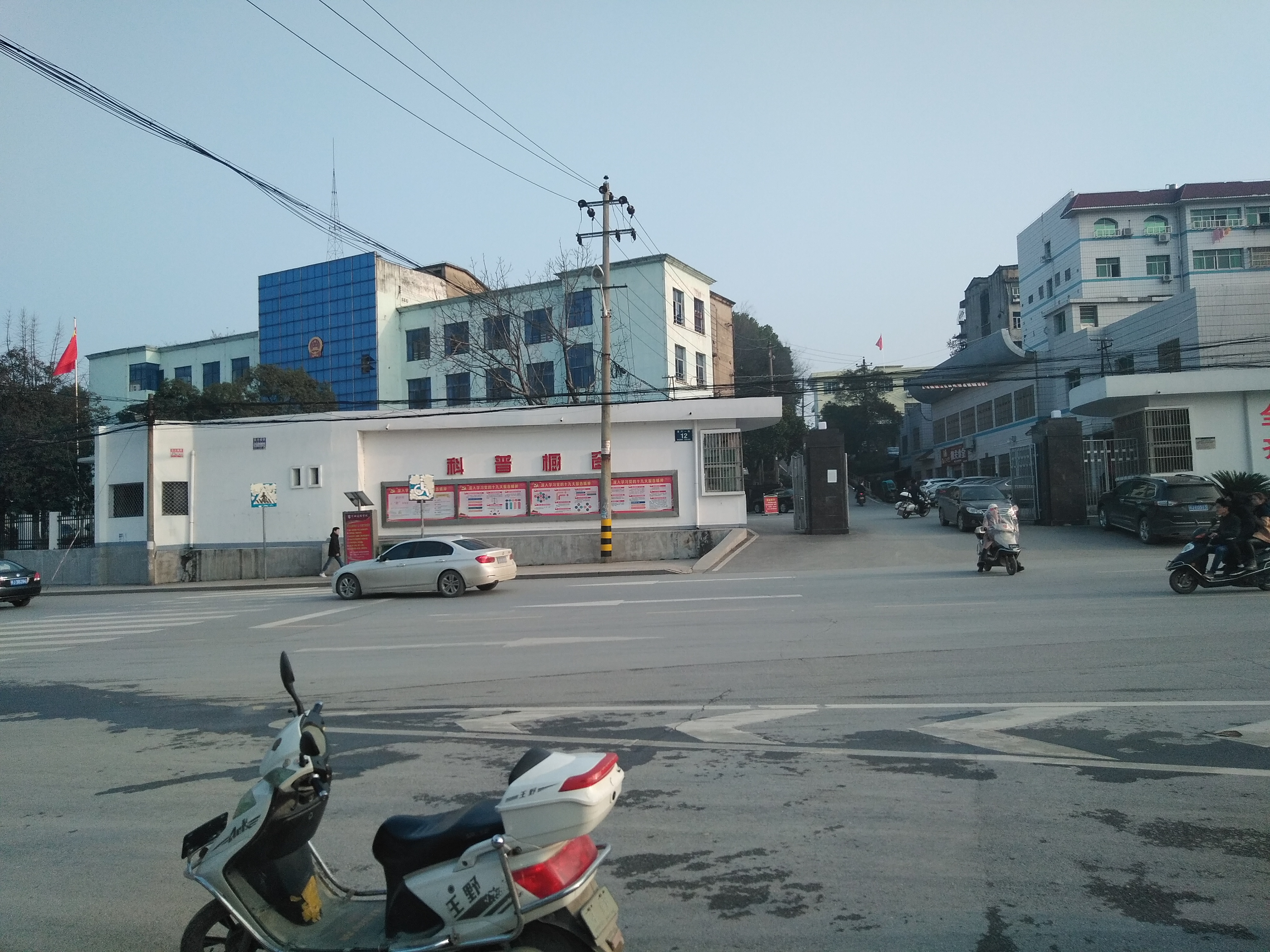
The county government building

The county's government is seated in the town of Caohe. The government buildings for the County and the Town are adjacent to each other.

== Demographics ==
The 2020 Chinese census put Qichun County's population at 792,101.

The 2010 Chinese census put Qichun County's population at 727,805.

A 2004 estimate approximated Qichun County's population at 951,391.

The 2000 Chinese census put Qichun County's population at 949,479.

A 1996 estimate put Qichun County's population at about 921,000.

Qichun Town's population was 162,000, of whom 71,000 were engaged in agriculture (fisheries, crops, and herbs are the main agricultural sectors) and the remainder non-agriculture (which includes minerals and manufacturing of various kinds). About 40% of all the farmers of Qichun County are engaged in growing herbs.

== Culture ==
Qichun County is the birthplace of famous herbalist Li Shizhen, who was born and lived in Qizhou town, and has been a major historical center of traditional Chinese medicine for hundreds of years.

Qichun County is often nicknamed "Professor County" (Chinese: 教授县; pinyin: Jiàoshòu Xiàn) due to the high amount of professors and other academic experts hailing from the county.

== Transportation ==
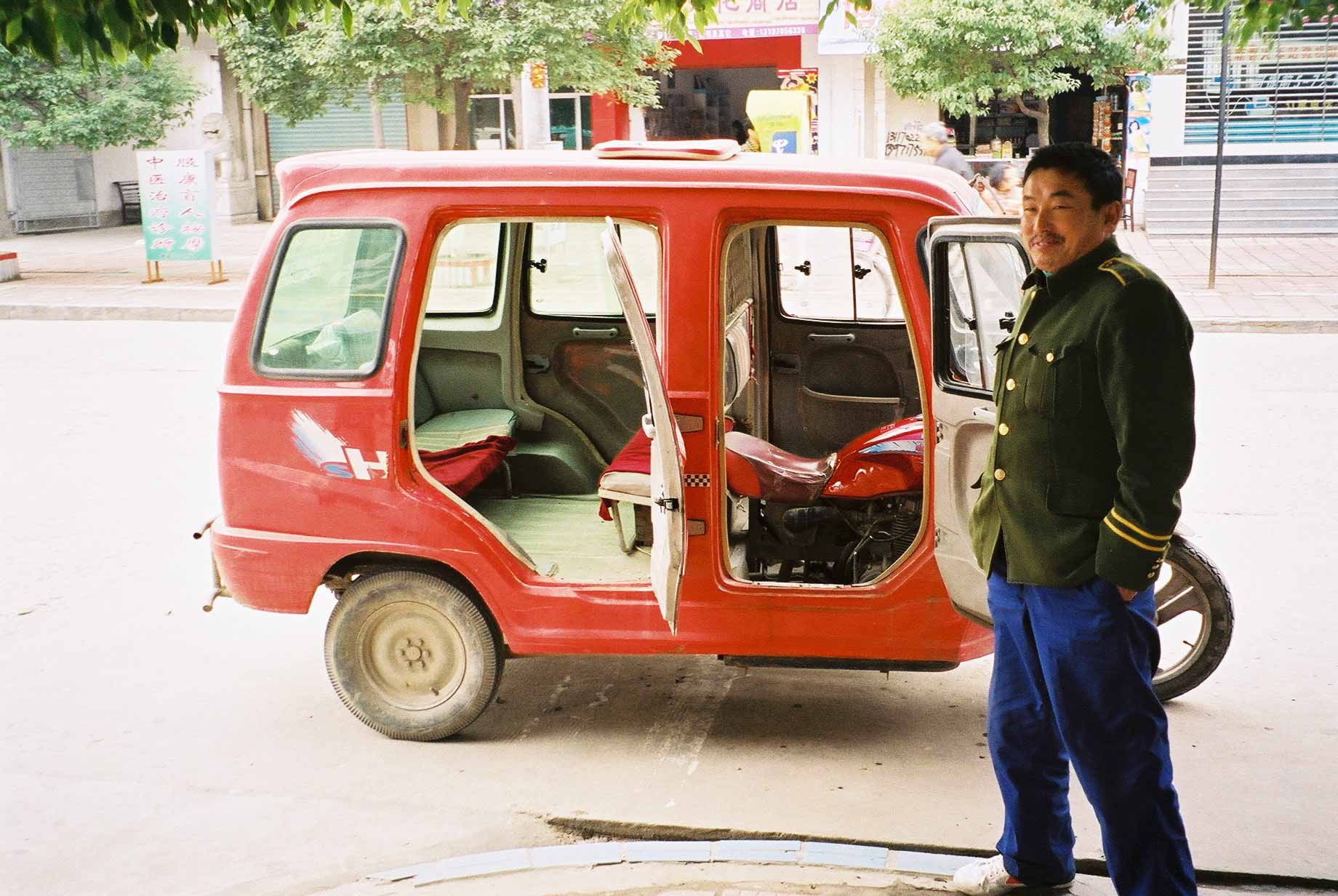
Qichun Motorbike Taxi

Qichun is reasonably well-served by rail, bus, and road transportation; there is no airport.

The Beijing–Kowloon railway runs through Qichun County. The main Beijing to Guangzhou rail line passes through Qichun, and there are local trains, west to the Hubei provincial capital of Wuhan and south-east into Jiangxi province. In April 2022, the opening of the Huanggang–Huangmei high-speed railway connected Qichun to the national high-speed rail network via the newly built Qichun South railway station.

There is a local bus service and also frequent express buses into Wuhan via the new inter-provincial expressway running east–west across the province. A journey by express bus to Wuhan takes less than three hours; by car the journey is less than 2.5 hours.

Major expressways in Qichun County include the Huangshi-Huanggang portion of the G70 Fuzhou–Yinchuan Expressway, which runs through the southwest of Qichun County. the G42 Shanghai–Chengdu Expressway, and the G50 Shanghai–Chongqing Expressway. National Highway 318 also runs through Qichun County. The Liu-Jie Highway, the Qi-Cao Highway (Chinese: 蕲漕公路; pinyin: Qí-Cáo Gōnglù), and the Qi-Tai Highway (Chinese: 蕲太公路; pinyin: Qí-Tài Gōnglù) all run through Qichun County. Other major roads include the Huang-Biao Highway (Chinese: 黄标公路; pinyin: Huáng-Biāo Gōnglù), and the Dabie Mountains Red Tourism Highway (Chinese: 大别山红色旅游公路; pinyin: Dàbié Shān Hóngsè Lǚyóu Gōnglù). Numerous future expressways have been completed，For example, Qichun-Taihu Expressway.

== Economy ==
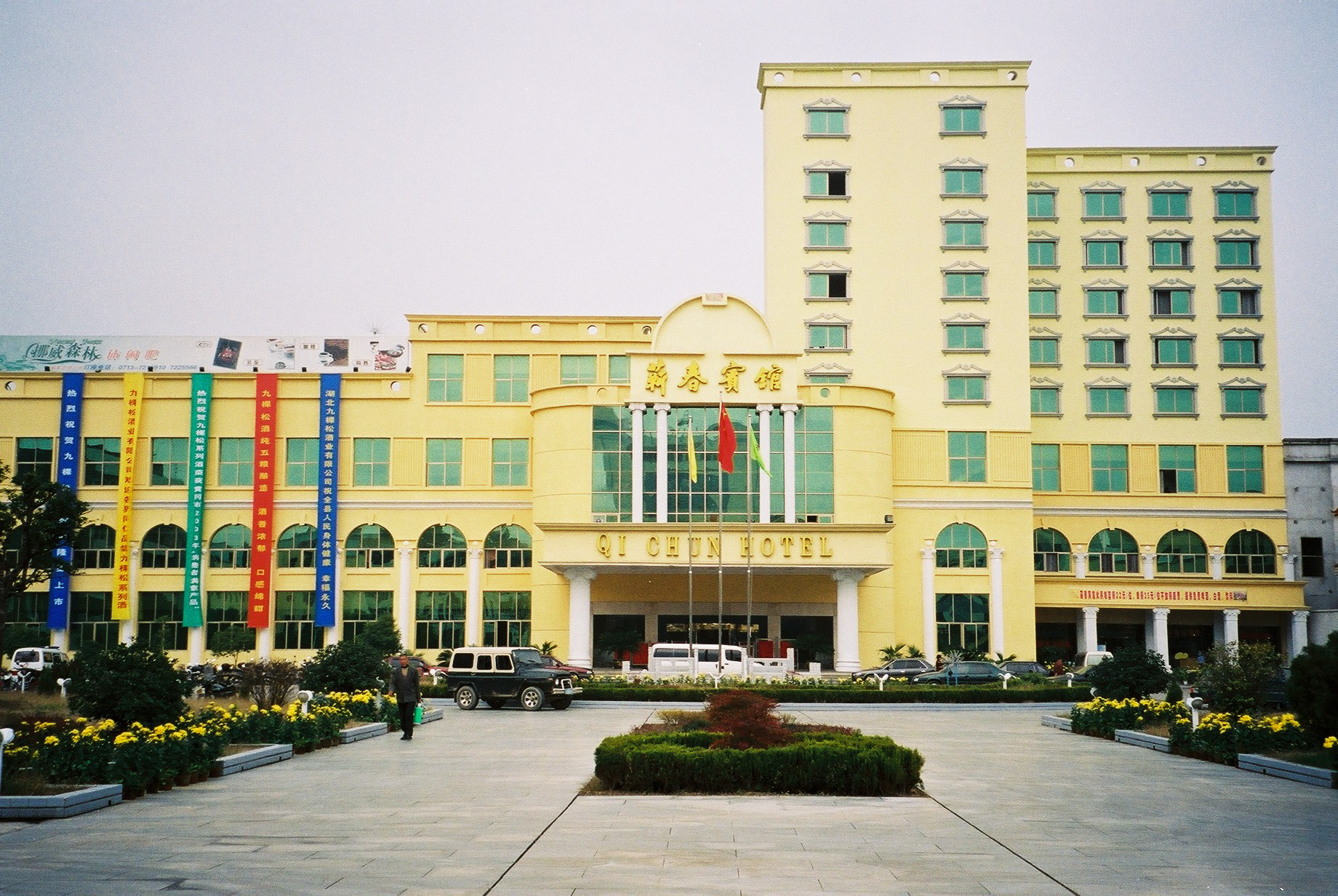
Qichun Hotel

Mineral resources in Qichun County include gold, copper, manganese, lead, iron, quartz, serpentine, dolomite, marble, and black jade.

Qichun is known as the "Capital of Moxa" in China. The cultivation and processing of mugwort (moxa) is a pillar industry of the local economy.

Qichun County has long played an outsized role in traditional Chinese medicine, and was historically home to large markets for medicinal ingredients. Medicinal markets remain central to Qichun County, which hosts the Hubei Lishizhen Traditional Chinese Medicine Professional Market (Chinese: 李时珍中药材专业市场; pinyin: Lǐ Shízhēn Zhōngyàocái Zhuānyè Shìchǎng). The majority of the entries in the Bencao Gangmu, an encyclopedia of traditional Chinese medicine ingredients, can be found in Qichun County. According to the county government, there is more than 200,000 mu of cropland devoted to growing medicinal ingredients.

The herbal industry, centered on Qizhou, is the biggest component of the Qichun County economy. Some 200,000 herb farmers live in Qichun County. They produce more than 700 varieties. The local herb wholesale market is the third largest in China, with more than 800 million yuan (US$100 million, as of 2006) of annual trading volume.

There is only one hotel of any significance in Qichun. But it is a new hotel, built around 2001.

== Social welfare ==
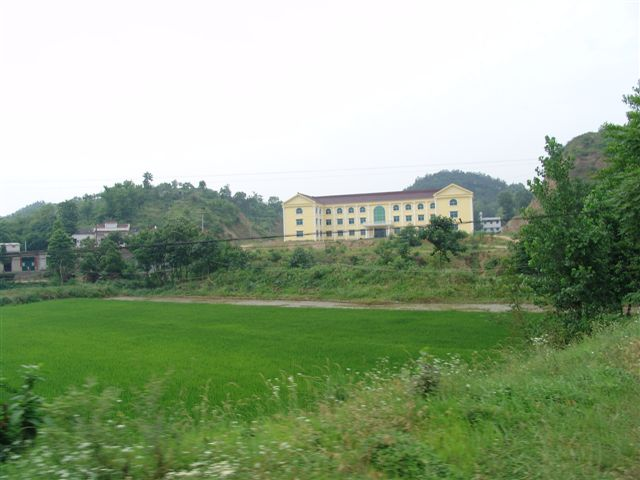
Qichun Social Welfare Institute, new building, 2005, with old building (white) behind it on the right.

Qichun County has its own Social Welfare Institute (SWI) to accommodate elderly people, handicapped persons, the homeless, and orphans. The Social Welfare Institute constructed a new building in 2004, designed mainly for the elderly and handicapped children and adults. Children which are abandoned or orphaned, and are awaiting adoption either domestically or internationally, are placed with local foster families. But they visit the SWI weekly for medical checks and group playtime activities. About 400 orphans have been adopted internationally from Qichun County SWI. These children now live with families all over the world: in Canada and the US, in Australasia, and in most countries of Western Europe.

== Notable people ==
Qichun County was a historical center for education and traditional Chinese medicine, as well as an economic and cultural center within eastern Hubei. The county has produced many important historical figures in this field, including herbalist Li Shizhen. Other notable figures from Qichun County during dynastic China include the following:

- Gu Jingxing (1621–1687), a prolific author of hundreds of books, and an Imperial scholar from a long hereditary line of scholars going back several generations of the Gu family.
- Wu Shu, a Song dynasty writer.
- Kang Maocai, a famous warrior from the Ming dynasty.

More-recent famous people from Qichun include:

- Wu Shu (writer and Communist revolutionary, 1902–1985);
- Hu Feng (literary theorist, 1902–1985);
- Huang Kan (Professor, newspaper founder, 1886–1935);
- Zhan Dabei (KMT leftist, 1887–1927);
- Tian Tong (1879–1930, author and Minister of Internal Affairs in the revolutionary government of Sun Yatsen);
- Dong Yuhua (Chinese: 董毓华; leader of student movement and military commander, 1907–1939);
- Yuan Shu (government Minister, started Chinese Communist Party intelligence system, 1911–1987);
- Gao Huiyuan (born 1922) medical scientist and doctor to Premier Zhou Enlai;
- Yu Xiaozhong (余笑忠) (born 1965) poet.
