= Siege of Luoyang =

Siege of Luoyang can refer to any of the following sieges of the Chinese city of Luoyang, which served as imperial capital to a number of Chinese dynasties:

- Siege of Luoyang (303–304), by Sima Ying and Sima Yong
- Siege of Luoyang (308), by Wang Mi
- Siege of Luoyang (309), by Liu Cong
- Siege of Luoyang (538), by Gao Huan
- Siege of Luoyang (613), by Yang Xuangan
- Siege of Luoyang (618), by Li Mi
- Siege of Luoyang (620–621), by Li Shimin
- Siege of Luoyang (1234), during the Mongol conquest of the Song dynasty

== See also ==
- Disaster of Yongjia
- Battle of Luoyang (328–329)
