= Duke of Wei =

Duke of Wei is a Chinese title which may refer to:

- the rulers of the state of Wei, during the Spring and Autumn period
- Li Mi, one of the contenders for the throne after the collapse of the Sui dynasty
