= Wang Shichong =

Chinese general and self-proclaimed emperor (567–621)

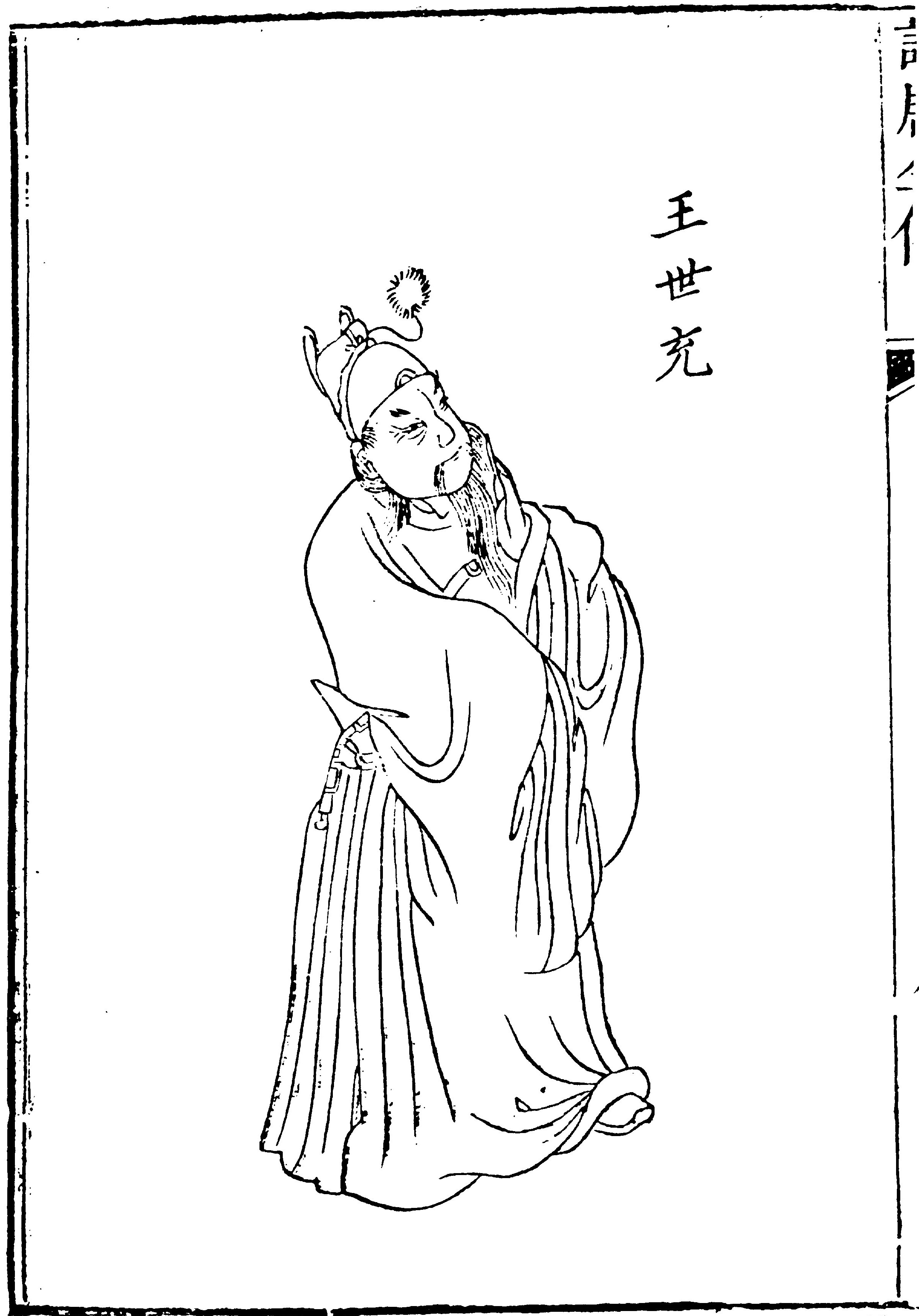
- Reign: 25 May 619 – 4 June 621
- Born: 567; China
- Died: c.August 621 (aged 54); China
Full name
- Family name: Wáng (王); Given name: Shìchōng (世充)
Era name and dates
- Kāimíng (開明): 26 May 619 – 4 June 621
- Dynasty: Zhèng (鄭)
- Occupation: Military general, monarch, politician

Wang Shichong
- Chinese: 王世充
Transcriptions
Standard Mandarin
- Hanyu Pinyin: Wáng Shìchōng
- Wade–Giles: Wang^{2} Shih^{4}-ch'ung^{1}
- IPA: [wǎŋ ʂɻ̩̂.ʈʂʰʊ́ŋ]

Wang Shichong (王世充; 567– c.August 621), courtesy name Xingman (行滿), was a Chinese military general, monarch, and politician during the Sui dynasty who deposed Sui's last emperor Yang Tong and briefly ruled as the emperor of a succeeding state of Zheng. He first became prominent during the reign of Emperor Yang of Sui as one of the few Sui generals having success against rebel generals, and during Yang Tong's brief reign, he was able to defeat the rebel general Li Mi and seize Li Mi's territory. After becoming emperor, however, he was unable to withstand military pressure from Tang dynasty forces, forcing him to seek aid from Dou Jiande the Prince of Xia. After Dou was defeated and captured by the Tang general Li Shimin (the later Emperor Taizong), Wang surrendered. Emperor Gaozu of Tang spared him, but the Tang official Dugu Xiude (獨孤修德), whose father Dugu Ji (獨孤機) had been executed by Wang, assassinated him.

== Early career ==
Wang Shichong's ancestors were surnamed Zhi (支), originally from the Western Regions (Xiyu) and were presumably ethnic Yuezhi from his surname. After his grandfather Zhi Tuinou (支頹耨) died early, his grandmother married a man named Wang, who also adopted his father Zhi Shou (支收), who thereafter changed his name to Wang. Wang Shou later served as a secretary to the governor of Bian Province (汴州, roughly modern Kaifeng, Henan). The Book of Sui described Wang as a cunning and skeptical man with curly hair and a jackal-like voice.

Wang Shichong himself was said to be studious in his youth, particularly concentrating on military strategies. He was also well-acquainted with laws. He apparently had contributions as a soldier and was gradually promoted. It was said that he was skillful in his application of laws and use of language, such that even when he made suggestions that did not appear to make sense logically, people were unable to refute him.

By 610, after Zhang Heng (張衡), the supervising official of Emperor Yang's palace at Jiangdu (江都, in modern Yangzhou, Jiangsu), fell from Emperor Yang's grace, Wang replaced him. As Emperor Yang frequently visited Jiangdu, Wang was said to be skillful at flattering the emperor as well as decorating the palace in an extravagant manner, bringing favor from the emperor. It was further said that Wang understood that Sui was soon to be in disturbance, and therefore carefully cultivated relationships with brave men. Whenever people were imprisoned, he would often find ways to free them, to gain their gratitude.

In 613, when the general Yang Xuangan rebelled near the eastern capital Luoyang, agrarian rebels south of the Yangtze River rose as well, with Liu Yuanjin (劉元進) as their leader. Emperor Yang initially sent the generals Tuwan Xu (吐萬緒) and Yu Juluo (魚俱羅) against Liu, but Tuwan and Yu were not able to defeat Liu conclusively. Emperor Yang executed Yu, and Tuwan died in fear. Emperor Yang instead sent Wang, and Wang defeated Liu, killing him. Wang initially promised not to kill Liu's soldiers, and they surrendered, but he slaughtered them after they surrendered. However, Emperor Yang, believing that Wang was a capable general, bestowed even greater favor on him.

In 614, the major rebel leader Meng Rang (孟讓) advanced south from his home commandery, Qi Commandery (roughly modern Jinan, Shandong), advancing to Xuyi (盱眙, in modern Huai'an, Jiangsu). Wang led his army against Meng and built five fences to block Meng's path, while feigning weakness. Meng, believing Wang to be an incompetent civilian, spread his forces, not only to attack Wang, but also to pillage the area. Wang, catching Meng by surprise, struck back, defeating Meng and forcing him to flee.

In the fall of 615, Emperor Yang, Empress Xiao, and much of the Sui court was touring Yanmen Commandery on the northern frontier when it received word from the Chinese princess Yicheng that her husband, Shibi Khan, was launching a surprise attack on the area. They hurried to the commandery seat at present-day Daixian in Shanxi; the Turks besieged it on 11 September. The emperor sent out messages of distress, promising promotion and riches to his saviors. Wang launched his army from Jiangdu toward Yanmen Commandery despite the long distance. During the journey, he often wept and was disheveled, stating his fear for the emperor's safety. Because the siege was lifted largely through the treacherous deception of Princess Yicheng, who told her husband that the khaganate had come under attack from the north in his absence, Emperor Yang followed the advice of councilors like Su Wei and gave no rewards and few promotions to the soldiers who had come to his assistance, causing great resentment among the military. Hearing of Wang's great personal distress, however, the emperor believed in his loyalty and promoted him to acting governor of Jiangdu in 616.

After the general Yang Yichen defeated and killed the rebel general Ge Qian (格遷), (Note: According to Wang's biographies in the Old Book of Tang and New Book of Tang, it was Yang Yichen who killed Ge; however, the Zizhi Tongjian indicated that it was Wang who killed Ge.) Wang crushed the remainder of Ge's forces, and also those of Lu Mingyue (盧明月). Emperor Yang was impressed with his success and personally awarded him wine.

== Struggle against Li Mi ==
Map of the situation in northern China during the transition from the Sui to the Tang, with the main contenders for the throne and the main military operations

In fall 617, with Luoyang under the threat of the rebel leader Li Mi the Duke of Wei, who had captured the large food storages that Emperor Yang had built near Luoyang and begun to starve the Sui defense forces at Luoyang, Emperor Yang, then at Jiangdu, sent Wang Shichong, along with several other generals, Wang Shilong (王士隆), Wei Ji (韋霽), and Wang Bian (王辯), from various locations of the empire, to aid Luoyang. They were under the command of Xue Shixiong (薛世雄), who was ordered to take his forces from Zhuo Commandery (涿郡, roughly modern Beijing) to Luoyang was well. However, Xue was intercepted and defeated by Dou Jiande and forced to return to Zhuo Commandery, and died there, leaving the other generals without a central commander. When Wang Shichong, Wang Bian, and Wei arrived at Luoyang, they stalemated with Li across the Luo River, and Emperor Yang put the Sui forces under Wang Shichong's command. For the next several months, he battled with Li, and while each had victories, the results were generally indecisive, although Wang's forces took the brunt of the losses. Meanwhile, he had hoped that Li and his key general Zhai Rang would eventually have a fallout and that he could use the fallout to his advantage, but in winter 617 Li assassinated Zhai without Wang's being able to take advantage.

In spring 618, after his forces were reinforced by 70,000 men sent by Emperor Yang's grandson Yang Tong the Prince of Yue, who was nominally in command at Luoyang, Wang launched a major attack on Li, but was defeated by Li, allowing Li to then crush the other Sui forces as well. In light of the victory, a number of Sui generals and rebel generals all submitted to Li, requesting Li to take imperial title, but Li declined. Wang retreated to Luoyang, and for a while did not dare to engage Li again.

Later in spring 618, Emperor Yang was killed at Jiangdu in a coup led by the general Yuwen Huaji. When the news reached Luoyang, the Sui officials at Luoyang, including Wang, declared Yang Tong emperor. Wang was made one of the heads of the examination bureau (門下省, Menxia Sheng) and created the Duke of Zheng. He and six other officials, Duan Da (段達), Yuan Wendu (元文都), Huangfu Wuyi (皇甫無逸), Lu Chu (盧楚), Guo Wenyi (郭文懿), and Zhao Changwen (趙長文), formed a collective leadership and were known as the "seven nobles."

With Yuwen leading the elite Xiaoguo Army (驍果) back north toward Luoyang, both the Sui officials at Luoyang and Li were apprehensive of Yuwen's plans. In summer, after Yuan and Lu advocated the plan, Yang Tong entered into a peace agreement with Li, where Li accepted Sui titles and nominally submitted to Yang Tong. Li was subsequently able to repel Yuwen's attacks, and when the news reached Luoyang, the officials were largely pleased—but Wang was not, stating, "Why are they giving offices and titles to a bandit?" This drew suspicions from Yuan and Lu that Wang was intending to surrender the city to Yuwen. The "seven nobles" thereafter came to suspect each other.

Wang began to incite his troops by telling them that they would soon fall into Li's trap, and that if Li received the command over them (as Li was nominally bestowed the office of supreme commander of the armed forces), he would surely slaughter them for having resisted him. When Yuan received news that Wang was doing this, he planned to ambush Wang. However, Duan revealed the plot to Wang, and Wang started a coup himself first, killing Lu and surrounding the palace. Huangfu fled to Chang'an, the capital of Emperor Gaozu of Tang (Li Yuan), a former Sui general who had first nominally supported Emperor Yang's grandson Yang You (Emperor Gong) as emperor, but who had taken the throne himself earlier in 618 to establish Tang dynasty. At Wang's insistence, Yang Tong surrendered Yuan, who remarked to Yang Tong, "If I die in the morning, Your Imperial Majesty will die in the evening." Yang Tong wept, but still sent Yuan to Wang, who executed Yuan. Wang then met Yang Tong and pledged his loyalty, swearing that all he intended was to save himself and save the empire. Yang Tong took Wang inside the palace to meet Yang Tong's mother Empress Dowager Liu, and Wang swore before her as well. Nevertheless, from this point, all power was in Wang's hands, and Yang Tong himself was powerless. Guo and Zhao were also seized and executed. However, initially Wang continued to be outwardly respectful to the young emperor, while he flattered Empress Dowager Liu by offering to be her adopted son and honoring her with the title of "Empress Dowager Shenggan" (聖感皇太后).

== As Sui regent ==
Upon hearing of Yuan Wendu's and Lu Chu's deaths, Li Mi broke off of peaceful relations with Yang Tong's regime. However, Li had a low opinion of Wang Shichong, and therefore took few precautions against an attack from Wang. At that time, Li's army lacked clothes, while Wang's army lacked food. Against his initial judgment, Li was persuaded by his secretary Bing Yuanzhen (邴元真), who could benefit from the transactions, to trade food to Wang for clothes. As a result, the people of Luoyang stopped surrendering to Li, and while Li then stopped the transactions, the damage was done. Meanwhile, Li's army was worn out and heavily damaged by wars with Yuwen Huaji's Xiaoguo Army as well. While he had earlier received the submission of Wang's family members—including Wang's brother Wang Shiwei (王世偉) and sons Wang Xuanying (王玄應), Wang Xuanshu (王玄恕), and Wang Xuanqiong (王玄瓊) -- he did not take particular use of them, but only detained them at the city of Yanshi (偃師, in modern Luoyang) with hopes to use them in the future to get Wang Shichong to surrender.

Wang took this opportunity to launch a major attack on Li in fall 618. He first defeated Li himself at the Battle of Yanshi (after convincing his army that the spirit of the Duke of Zhou had predicted a victory) and, finding someone whose appearance was similar to Li, used him to declare that Li had been captured, further raising his army's morale. He then attacked and captured Yanshi, not only taking his family members but also the family members of many of Li's generals. He then made another assault on Li—which Li reacted slowly to and could not counter. Bing and Shan Xiongxin surrendered to Wang. Li, after initially considering fleeing to join forces with his general Xu Shiji—a friend of Zhai Rang's, ultimately decided to flee west instead to Tang territory to submit to Emperor Gaozu of Tang. After Li left the region, most of Li's territory surrendered to Yang Tong's regime, as did the major rebel general Zhu Can. (Xu, however, did not, and the area under his control submitted to Tang as well.) The major rebel leader Dou Jiande, who had claimed the title of Prince of Xia, also nominally submitted to Yang Tong.

Wang was given the honorific office of Taiwei (太尉), and he began to gather officials with good reputations onto his staff. Wang encouraged people to offer suggestions, putting three wooden signs before his headquarters, requesting for three types of people to volunteer or to provide suggestions:

1. Those who were knowledgeable, who could be responsible for major projects;
2. Those who had bravery or tactics, who could be successful on the battlefield;
3. Those who suffered from wrong, who needed someone to listen to their petitions.

However, it was said that Wang, although he welcomed these suggestions and petitions, actually did not act on them, and that while he used kind words to comfort even the lowest of soldiers, he did little in actions to benefit them. In spring 619, Wang's subordinates Dugu Wudu (獨孤武都), Dugu Wudu's cousin Dugu Ji, Yang Gongshen (楊恭慎), Sun Shixiao (孫師孝), Liu Xiaoyuan (劉孝元), Li Jian (李儉), and Cui Xiaoren (崔孝仁) plotted to surrender Luoyang to Tang troops, but were discovered, and they were all executed.

Meanwhile, during a feast in Yang Tong's palace, Wang suffered from a severe case of food poisoning, and he believed that he was poisoned, and thereafter refused to see Yang Tong again. When Yang Tong, fearing his fate, tried to receive divine blessing by having the palace treasures given to the poor, Wang put soldiers around the palace to stop it. In late spring 619, Wang had Yang Tong create him the Prince of Zheng and grant him the nine bestowments—both ultimate steps before taking the throne. He also had his subordinates openly discuss in public how it would be proper for him to take the throne. In summer 619, he had Duan Da and Yun Dingxing (雲定興) enter the palace to persuade Yang Tong to yield the throne to him, and further sent messengers to Yang Tong to say:

Now the empire is not peaceful and needs an older emperor to rule over it. When it is pacified, I will return the throne to you, as I had sworn before.

He then had an edict issued in Yang Tong's name, yielding the throne to him, ending Sui and establishing a new state of Zheng.

== Reign ==
Wang Shichong made his son Wang Xuanying crown prince and Wang Xuanshu the Prince of Han. He made 19 other relatives his princes, and Yang Tong the former emperor the Duke of Lu. He did not have a fixed office; rather, he worked at several offices in the city, and he was in the habit of receiving personal submissions from the people to show that he was open to suggestions, but the idea backfired as too many people submitted petitions, making him unable to read them all. It was also said that he was overly talkative at imperial meetings, causing them to drag on overly long. Meanwhile, in light of his taking the throne, a number of commanderies that had submitted to Yang Tong submitted to either Tang or Xia, and Dou Jiande formally broke with Wang and took imperial style, albeit not imperial title. Further, after Wang attacked Liyang (黎陽, in modern Hebi, Henan), which Xia had seized from Tang, in winter 619, and Dou retaliated by attacking Yin Prefecture (殷州, roughly modern Xinxiang, Henan), the states became enemies.

A month later, Pei Renji and his son Pei Xingyan (裴行儼), as well as the officials Yuwen Rutong (宇文儒童), Yuwen Wen (宇文溫, Yuwen Rutong's brother), and Cui Deben (崔德本) plotted to kill Wang and restore Yang Tong. The news leaked, and the conspirators were slaughtered, along with their families. Wang Shichong's brother Wang Shiyun (王世惲) the Prince of Qi persuaded Wang Shichong that in order to avoid a repeat of the plot, he needed to put Yang Tong to death. Wang Shichong agreed, and he sent his nephew Wang Renze (王仁則) the Prince of Tang and his servant Liang Bainian (梁百年) to force Yang Tong to drink poison. Yang Tong made one last plea, pointing out that Wang Shichong had previously promised to keep him alive. Liang considered requesting confirmation from Wang Shichong, but Wang Shiyun refused. Yang Tong set sacrifices for the Buddha and prayed, "May it be that I will no longer again be reborn into an imperial household." He drank poison, but initially did not die. Wang Shiyun ordered that he be strangled.

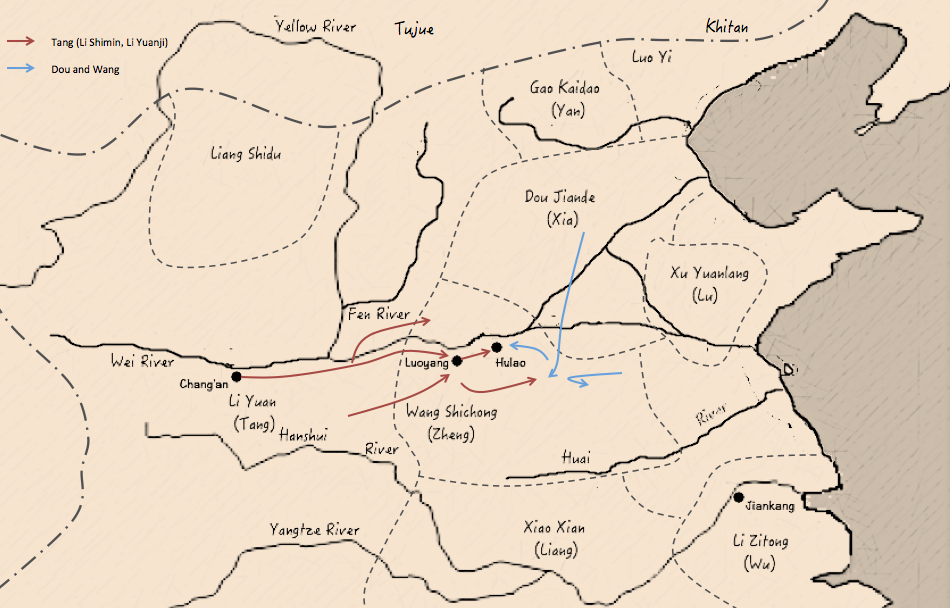
The Battle of Luoyang-Hulao

Meanwhile, Zheng and Tang had continuous battles near Luoyang and also to the west and south, with the sides trading victories. In fall 620, Tang's Emperor Gaozu commissioned his son Li Shimin the Prince of Qin with an army to attack Luoyang, and Wang Shichong prepared his own forces to defend and counter. Wang sought to enter into a peace agreement with Li Shimin, but Li Shimin declined, and he captured Zheng cities one by one, either by attacking them or by accepting their surrender. By winter 620, Zheng was in a desperate situation, and Wang Shichong sent messengers to Dou, seeking help from Xia forces. Dou, believing that if Tang destroyed Zheng, his own Xia state would be cornered, agreed, and sought to diplomatically convince Li Shimin to withdraw, but Li Shimin again refused. Meanwhile, in spring 621, Li Shimin put Luoyang under siege. Wang's forces had strong catapults and crossbows, inflicting much casualties on Tang forces, and many Tang generals wished to withdraw. Li Shimin, however, believed that Luoyang would fall soon and therefore refused. Upon hearing that Dou was approaching, he decided to advance east to take up defensive position at the key Hulao Pass in advance of Dou's arrival, leaving a relatively small Tang army, under the command of his brother Li Yuanji the Prince of Qi, at Luoyang. Wang, seeing Li Shimin's troop movement but unsure what the situation was, did not attack Li Shimin's rear (as some of Li Shimin's generals feared).

Meanwhile, Dou, against the advice of his strategist Ling Jing (凌敬) and his wife Empress Cao, advanced to Hulao in summer 621. Li Shimin initially refused to engage him, wearing his troops out, and then counterattacked, defeating and capturing him. Li Shimin took the captured Dou and Wang's emissaries Wang Wan (王琬) the Prince of Dai (Wang Shichong's nephew) and Zhangsun Anshi (長孫安世) to Luoyang to display them to Wang Shichong. Wang Shichong, after a conversation with Dou, broke down in tears. He considered fighting his way out of the siege and fleeing to Xiangyang, defended by his nephew Wang Honglie (王弘烈) the Prince of Wei. His generals pointed out that he was dependent on Xia help, and now that Dou had been captured, there was nothing further to be done. Wang therefore exited the city and surrendered to Li Shimin. Li Shimin executed a number of his high level officials, but spared Wang himself, his family, and the rest of the officials.

== Death ==
Li Shimin took Wang Shichong and Dou Jiande back to the Tang capital Chang'an to present them to his father Emperor Gaozu. When Emperor Gaozu met Wang and rebuked him, Wang stated, "I should be beheaded, but the Prince of Qin had agreed to spare me." In fall 621, Emperor Gaozu spared him but demoted him to commoner rank, exiling him and his clan to modern Sichuan, while executing Dou.

Meanwhile, Wang and his family members were awaiting exile, and were detained at the barracks of the capital prefecture, Yong Prefecture (雍州). Dugu Xiude, the son of Dugu Ji, took the opportunity to enter the barracks, claiming that Emperor Gaozu wished to see Wang Shichong. Wang Shichong and his brother Wang Shiyun came out to greet Dugu, and Dugu executed them to avenge his father. Emperor Gaozu only punished Dugu by removing him from his post as the prefect of Ding Prefecture (定州, roughly modern Baoding, Hebei). The other members of the Wang clan were exiled, but on their way plotted rebellion, and were all executed.

Of all of the contenders to rule the empire during Sui's disintegration, Wang was one of the most reviled by traditional historians. The Later Jin historian Liu Xu, the lead editor of the Old Book of Tang, commented:

Wang Shichong was a wicked man who happened to encounter an incompetent ruler. He flattered the emperor and did what others could not have done in exchange for wealth and honor. To his subordinates, he used wrongful rhetoric to hide his own faults and suppress dissent. He finally usurped the throne, carried out improper acts, and killed many cruelly. He used false expressions of empathy to control his officials. His subordinates were almost all rebels or desperate men. He finally surrendered to the Prince of Qin and was quite fortunate that he was not publicly beheaded.

== Personal information ==
- Father
  - Wang Shou (王收), né Zhi Shou (支收), Sui dynasty official
- Children
  - Wang Xuanying (王玄應), the Crown Prince (created 619, executed by Emperor Gaozu of Tang 621)
  - Wang Xuanshu (王玄恕), the Prince of Han (created 619, executed by Emperor Gaozu of Tang 621)
  - Wang Xuanqiong (王玄瓊)

== In popular culture ==
Wang Shichong is portrayed by Hong Kong actor Kong Ngai in TVB's 1987 series The Grand Canal (大運河)

== Explanatory notes ==
Regnal titles
Preceded by Yang Tong of the Sui dynasty	Emperor of China (Henan/Northern Jiangsu/Northern Anhui); 619–621	Succeeded by Emperor Gaozu of Tang
