= Empress Cao (Dou Jiande's wife) =

Empress Cao (曹皇后, personal name unknown) was the wife of Dou Jiande, an agrarian rebel leader who claimed the title of Prince of Xia at the end of the Chinese Sui dynasty.

Nothing is known about her personal background. She was said to be frugal in her living, as even after Dou conquered modern Hebei and had substantial holdings, she had no decoration on her clothing, and only had less than 10 maids attending her. After Dou defeated and killed Yuwen Huaji, who possessed a large number of Emperor Yang of Sui's ladies in waiting, Dou disbanded the ladies in waiting. (Novels fictionalizing the era generally attribute Dou's disbanding of the ladies in waiting to his love for her and her jealousy, but nothing is recorded in history suggesting that she was, in fact, jealous.) Dou himself only claimed the title of prince, not emperor, but after he heard in 619 that Wang Shichong had deposed the last emperor of Sui, Yang Tong, and declared himself the Emperor of Zheng, Dou cut off Wang and began to take on imperial style in his ceremonies, including referring to his orders as imperial edicts. It was likely that it was at this time that he let her take on the title of empress.

In 621, with Wang's Zheng state under attack by the Tang dynasty general Li Shimin (the later Emperor Taizong), Wang sought aid from Dou. Dou, believing that if Li were able to conquer Zheng, that his Xia state would be next, decided to go to Wang's aid. As he approached Luoyang, his strategist Ling Jing (凌敬) suggested that instead of heading to Zheng's capital Luoyang, which Li was sieging, that he attack Tang's Fen (汾州, roughly modern Lüliang, Shanxi) and Jin (晉州, roughly modern Linfen, Shanxi) prefectures and be poised to further attack Tang's capital Chang'an in order to seize Tang territory as well as force Li to give up the siege on Luoyang. However, Wang's emissaries Wang Wan (王琬) and Zhangsun Anshi (長孫安世) persuaded Dou that Luoyang was about to fall and needed his aid immediately, and so Dou headed for Luoyang. When Empress Cao heard this, she tried to persuade Dou to accept Ling's plan, stating:

The strategy of the Secretary General [(i.e., Ling)] must be accepted, and I do not understand why Your Royal Highness would not accept it. Your Royal Highness should enter through Fukou [(滏口, in modern Handan, Hebei)] into Tang's weak spot. Connect your camps and capture the area north of the Taihang Mountains. This, combined with Tujue's pillages against Guanzhong [(Tang's capital region)], will force Tang forces to withdraw to save themselves. Why worry that you cannot lift the siege on Luoyang? If you remain here, the officers and the soldiers will all be tired, and you will spend much material, and you will not be successful.

Dou, however, responded:

You women will not understand this. We came to save Luoyang, which is in dire straits and about to fall. If we abandon it and leave, we show that we are fearful of the enemy and turning our back on faith and righteousness. I cannot do this.

He therefore continued to progress toward Luoyang, and he engaged Li at the Battle of Hulao. Li defeated and captured him, and Wang surrendered. Li took both Dou and Wang back to Chang'an to be presented to his father Emperor Gaozu of Tang, who executed Dou. The Xia forces withdrew to the Xia capital at Mingzhou (present-day Guangfu) and considered declaring Dou's adopted son as prince. The official Qi Shanxing (齊善行), however, persuaded the others that further resistance would be futile, and the treasures that the Xia state had previously obtained were distributed to the soldiers, who were then disbanded. Qi, the former Sui official Pei Ju, and Empress Cao's brother Cao Dan (曹旦) then accompanied her, carrying the treasures and the imperial seals Dou took after defeating Yuwen, and they surrendered to Tang forces. Nothing further was said about her in history.

== Notes ==
Chinese royalty
Preceded by Empress Xiao of the Sui dynasty	Empress of China (Hebei); 617–621	Succeeded by Empress Zhangsun of the Tang dynasty
