= Battle of Yanshi =

618 AD battle during the transition from the Sui to Tang dynasty in China

- Part of the transition from Sui to Tang
- Map of the situation in China during the transition from the Sui to the Tang, with the main contenders for the throne and the main military operations
Date	5–6 October 618
Location	Yanshi, east of Luoyang 34°44′N 112°48′E
Result	Wang Shichong victory

Belligerents
Sui dynasty	Li Mi's forces

Commanders and leaders
Wang Shichong	Li Mi

Strength
20,000	c. 40,000

Casualties and losses
Light	Heavy, large numbers surrendered
- Location of the battle

The Battle of Yanshi (Chinese: 偃師之戰) was fought on 5–6 October 618 between the armies of Wang Shichong and Li Mi, rival contenders for the succession of the Sui dynasty. Wang, who was still ostensibly a Sui loyalist and had been blockaded in Luoyang for months by Li, gambled on a decisive battle and led his troops out to attack the besieging army. Li assembled his forces on a naturally defensible position north of Yanshi town, but Wang managed to surprise Li's forces and approach their camp before they could react. Aided by a secondary cavalry attack from the rear, Wang secured a decisive victory over Li's forces. Although Li managed to escape with part of his army, his authority was shattered, and his followers joined Wang. While Li sought refuge in the rival Tang court, Wang consolidated his control over Henan and eventually deposed the Sui puppet ruler Yang Tong and declared himself as emperor of the new Zheng dynasty. Wang's power lasted until his surrender to the Tang prince Li Shimin in 621, and Li Mi was captured and executed by Sheng Yanshi.

== Background ==
During the later reign of the second emperor of the Sui dynasty, Yang (r. 604–618), the dynasty's authority began to wane: the immense material and human cost of the protracted and fruitless attempts to conquer the Korean kingdom of Goguryeo, coupled with natural disasters, caused unrest in the provinces, while the successive military failures eroded the emperor's prestige and legitimacy ('Mandate of Heaven') among the provincial governors. Yang nevertheless continued to be fixated on the Korean campaigns, and by the time he realized the gravity of the situation, it was too late: as revolts spread, in 616, he abandoned the north and withdrew to Jiangdu, where he remained until his assassination in 618. Local governors and magnates rose to claim power in the wake of Yang's withdrawal. By the summer of 618, nine major contenders emerged, some claiming the imperial title, others contenting themselves, for the time being, with the more modest titles of 'duke' (gōng) and 'king' (wáng). The three most powerful were Li Yuan, who seized the Sui capital of Daxingcheng (Chang'an) and on 16 June 618 proclaimed himself the first emperor of the Tang dynasty; Dou Jiande, a one-time bandit leader who had risen in revolt against the Sui already in 611, and came to control most of Hebei as the 'King of Changle' and then as the 'King of Xia'; and Li Mi in Henan, who led a mixture of rebelled peasants and Sui soldiers.

Li Mi's main enemy was the Sui general Wang Shichong, who controlled the eastern capital, Luoyang, and the remnants of the Sui administration there. Emperor Yang had sent him to the city in mid-617. In May 618, following Yang's murder by the general Yuwen Huaji, the Sui officials in Luoyang elevated Yang's grandson Yang Tong to the throne. In the meantime, Li Mi had managed to gain control over most of the surrounding area. When Yuwen Huaji moved north against Li Mi, Wang seized the opportunity to play both rebels against each other: Li Mi was offered an amnesty and a high court position if he would march against Emperor Yang's assassin. Li Mi, whose own base, the great granary at Liyang, was threatened, agreed, hoping in turn to profit from his legitimization and gain control of Luoyang. In the event, Li Mi heavily defeated Yuwen in a series of battles and forced him to withdraw to northern Hubei. Feeling threatened by Li Mi's growing power, and facing plots against him in Luoyang, Wang launched a coup d'état on 11 August 618 and seized power for himself, removing his opponents and barring the city to Li Mi. The two men now moved to a confrontation that, as the historian David Graff comments, could prove decisive for the outcome of the civil war. Wang "was fighting for survival", while Li had to capture Luoyang to "cement his hold over Henan". More importantly, "the victor would be left in possession of the most populous region of the Sui empire and could expect to receive the allegiance of many of the smaller armed factions".

== Battle of Yanshi ==
Facing starvation and surrender, Wang Shichong decided to risk an open confrontation with Li Mi, in an attempt to push him back and break the siege. Wang selected 20,000 "elite" troops—of which only 1,000 were cavalry—from Luoyang's garrison, apparently troops who had already participated in several expeditions against rebels and bandits under his command and were especially trustworthy. In order to embolden his men, Wang—who according to Graff "had a keen interest in divination and was fond of invoking unseen powers"—now invoked the semi-mythical figure of the founder of Luoyang, the Duke of Zhou: he had a shrine erected in the Duke of Zhou's honour, and shamans declared that the Duke promised that if they marched to confront Li Mi, they would win, whereas if they remained in Luoyang, they were doomed to die of pestilence.

Apparently this had the desired effect, for on 4 October 618 Wang led his army out of Luoyang and, following the course of the Luo River, marched eastward, bypassing Li Mi's forward positions. On the afternoon of the next day, Wang's army had reached the walled town of Yanshi, some 20 miles from Luoyang and located between the Luo River to the south and an irrigation canal to the north. There, deep inside enemy territory, Wang made camp. Li Mi had been at Jinyong Fortress, some 6 miles east of Luoyang, when he learned of Wang's sortie. He too selected the best men among his own troops, numbering around 40,000, left one of his generals in charge of Jinyong, and followed Wang eastward. Li Mi encamped on the Mang hills north of Yanshi.

Once there, Li Mi convened a council of war to determine his army's course of action. Li Mi advocated a passive and cautious stance, arguing that Wang's troops were not only experienced veterans, but that, as they were virtually cut off from retreat due to the Luo river, the canals, and the presence of his own army, they would fight with desperate courage—a situation already described and recommended as a strategy to galvanize one's troops by no lesser authority than Sun Tzu, and doubtlessly familiar to both opposing commanders. In addition, while lack of supplies constrained Wang to seek an early and decisive engagement, Li Mi's own forces had time on their side and could afford to sit out and wait until Wang's provisions were utterly exhausted. Most of Li's generals, however, vehemently disagreed, regarding Wang's army as an exhausted and demoralized force, and pointing to their own considerable numerical superiority. At this juncture, the heterogeneous nature of Li's army, cobbled together from bandit chieftains and Sui defectors, came into play: Li was well aware that his commanders were "potentially autonomous warlords who commanded the personal loyalty of their own subordinates", and that he could not afford to antagonize them. Therefore, against his better judgement, he was forced to agree to an immediate confrontation.

Nevertheless, Li Mi decided to await Wang's attack instead of attacking himself. The main host, under Li Mi, remained on the Mang hills, while a detachment under Shan Xiongxin moved down to the plain just north of Yanshi and established a camp there. The two camps, in the description of David Graff, formed "an inverted letter 'L' running east along the mountain and then turning sharply south across the plain to Yanshi". Li Mi felt confident in his superior position, which gave him ample time to descend the hills and move against Wang, should he try to cross the canal for an attack. If Wang attacked either of his camps, the troops of the other would come to aid, flanking Wang's forces. Confident in the naturally defensive layout of his hilltop camp, however, he neglected fortifying it.

The first clash between the two armies occurred on the same evening of 5 October, when Wang sent several hundred of his cavalry to attack Shan Xiongxin's camp on the plain. Li sent forces from the hills to his general's aid, but the battle ended quickly with the arrival of night. This attack was nothing more than a diversion, drawing Li's attention to the east while, under cover of night, Wang sent 200 of his cavalry around and behind Li's forces. Concealing themselves in a ravine behind Li's camp, they waited. During the night Wang laid bridges across the canal, and before dawn his army crossed over and deployed in battle formation close to Li Mi's camps. At daybreak, Li Mi's troops were caught entirely by surprise at the sight of the battle-ready enemy advancing onto them. As the camps were unfortified, the rebel troops tried to hastily form a battle line themselves, but they were unable to prevent Wang's forces from entering their encampments. At the same time, Wang signalled his hidden cavalry to attack. Charging down from the north into Li Mi's camp, the 200 horsemen began setting fire to it. At the sight of the camp to their rear going up in flames, Li Mi's army broke and fled. While Li Mi was able to escape with some 10,000 of his men, many of the rest surrendered to Wang. According to one account, Wang's victory was secured by a stratagem: one of his soldiers, who greatly resembled Li Mi, was bound and displayed to the rebel troops at the height of the battle, whereupon their resistance collapsed.

== Aftermath ==
While Li Mi survived, his authority suffered a devastating blow from which it could not recover. His followers started flocking to Wang Shichong, who quickly became the master of all territories "east to the sea and south as far as the River Yangzi". With the remnants of his army, Li Mi was forced to seek refuge with the Tang court in Chang'an. But later on, Li Mi was executed by Sheng Yanshi. Wang Shichong, on the other hand, now stood at the apex of his power. He appointed new senior officials and finally, in May 619 he deposed the puppet Sui emperor Yang Tong and declared himself as the first emperor of the Zheng dynasty. Soon, however, Wang's rule became cruel and repressive, costing him support. He was also unable to effectively confront the advancing Tang armies under Li Shimin, who in early 621 laid siege to Luoyang. Wang allied himself with Dou Jiande, who came to his aid; but Li Shimin scored a decisive victory at the Battle of Hulao on 28 May 621, taking Dou Jiande captive. Without hope of succour, Wang finally surrendered four days after the battle, and was killed on the way to his exile.

== Sources ==
- Graff, David A. (2002). Medieval Chinese Warfare, 300–900. London and New York: Routledge. ISBN 0-415-23955-9.
- Wechsler, Howard J. (1979). "The Founding of the T'ang Dynasty: Kao-tsu (Reign 618–26)". In Twitchett, Dennis (ed.). The Cambridge History of China, Volume 3: Sui and T'ang China, 589–906 AD, Part 1. Cambridge: Cambridge University Press. pp. 150–187. ISBN 978-0-521-21446-9.
- Wright, Arthur F. (1979). "The Sui Dynasty (581–617)". In Twitchett, Dennis (ed.). The Cambridge History of China, Volume 3: Sui and T'ang China, 589–906 AD, Part 1. Cambridge: Cambridge University Press. pp. 48–149. ISBN 978-0-521-21446-9.
