= Zhu Can =

Chinese agrarian rebel leader (died 621)

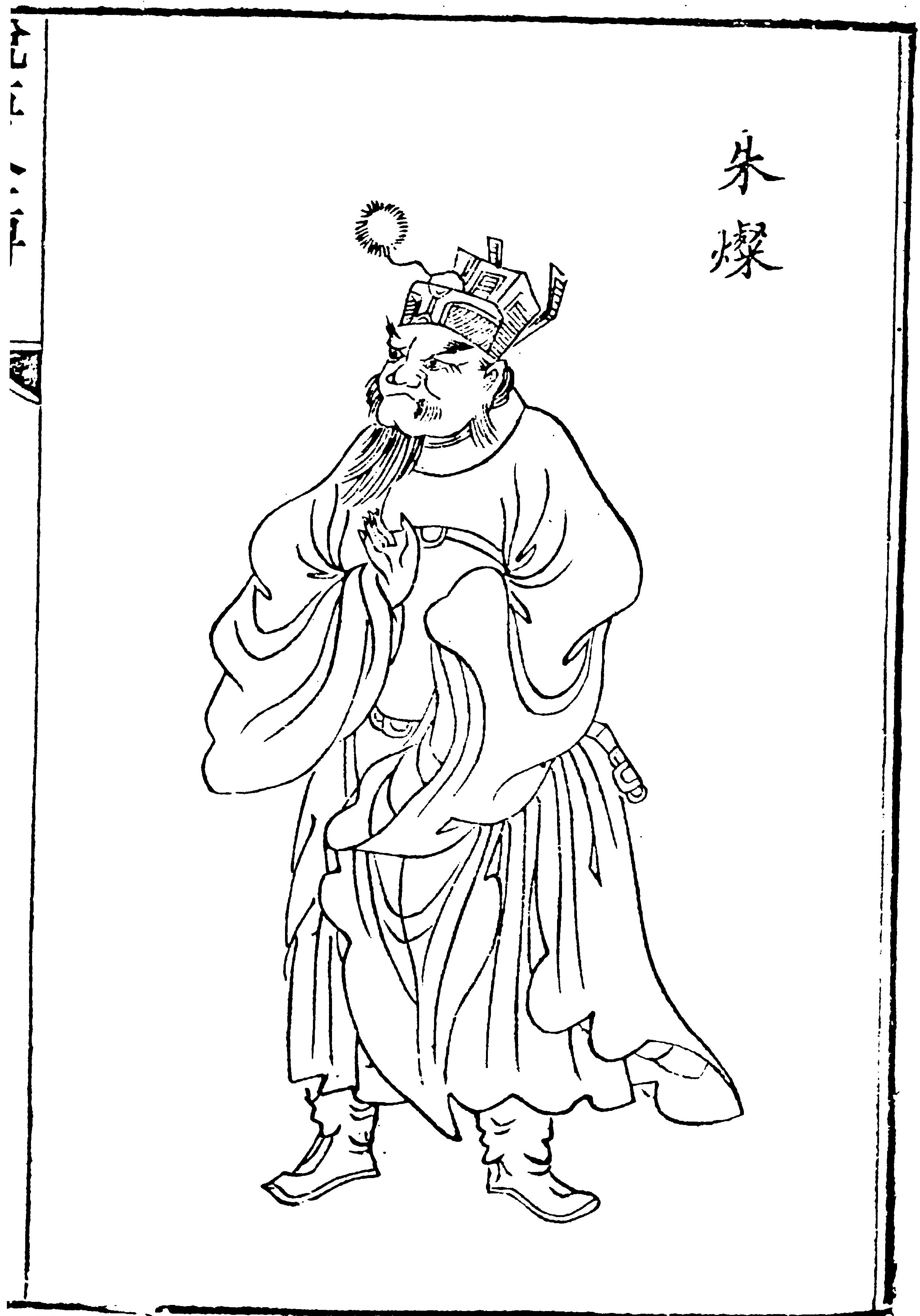
- Reign: 618–619
- Born: Unknown
- Died: 621
Full name
- Family name: 朱 (Zhū); Given name: 粲 (Càn)
Era name and dates
- 昌達 (Chāngdá): 618–619
- Dynasty: Chǔ (楚)

Zhu Can (朱粲) (died 621) was an agrarian rebel leader during the disintegration of the Chinese Sui dynasty. He was particularly noted for his cruelty and his penchant for favoring cannibalism, and he, while not having a set base of operation, generally roved with his army in the modern southern Henan area, claiming for himself the title of Emperor of Chu. He also at times submitted to Li Mi the Duke of Wei, the Sui emperor Yang Tong, Emperor Gaozu of Tang, and Wang Shichong the Emperor of Zheng. After finally breaking with Tang, he fled to the Zheng capital Luoyang, and after Luoyang fell to Tang in 621, he was executed.

== Initial uprising ==
Zhu Can was from Bo Province (毫州, roughly modern Bozhou, Anhui), and he was initially a minor official with his local county government. He joined the military when men were sought to combat the agrarian rebels at Changbai Mountain (長白山, in modern Binzhou, Shandong, not the namesake mountain range in Jilin), but in or before 615 he defected and led a group of rebels himself, which became known as the Kedahan Bandits (可達寒賊). He declared himself the Prince of Garuda (迦樓羅王), and he eventually crossed the Huai River south to attack the various commanderies of modern southern Henan, northern Hubei, and southern Shaanxi. It was said that Zhu was very cruel, and that wherever he went, he often massacred the population.

== Vacillation between independence and submission to various contenders ==
Although Zhu claimed for himself a princely title, he was also communicating with other rebel leaders, and in 617, he sent messengers to submit to Li Mi the Duke of Wei, who was then trying to capture the Sui eastern capital Luoyang. Li created him the Duke of Deng. In winter 617, he suffered a defeat at the hands of Li Xiaogong, the son of a cousin of Li Yuan the Prince of Tang (who had risen against Emperor Yang earlier that year and declared Emperor Yang's grandson Yang You, the Prince of Dai emperor, as Emperor Gong), but Li Xiaogong spared his soldiers.

In spring 618, after Li Mi achieved a great victory over the Sui general Wang Shichong, Zhu was one of the agrarian leaders who sent messengers to Li Mi, urging him to take imperial title, but Li Mi declined. Meanwhile, he continued to roam in southern Henan, despite defeats by Li Yuan's generals Ma Yuangui (馬元規) and Zhou Chao (周超).

In fall 618, after Li Mi was defeated by Wang and submitted to Li Yuan (who established the Tang dynasty after hearing of Emperor Yang's death earlier that year, at the hands of Yuwen Huaji), Zhu sent messengers to nominally submit to Emperor Yang's grandson Yang Tong, who had been declared emperor at Luoyang but who by this point was under Wang's control. Yang Tong created Zhu the Prince of Chu.

In winter 618, the Tang generals Ma Yuangui and Lü Zizang (呂子臧) again defeated Zhu, but when Lü suggested making one final assault against Zhu, Ma disagreed, and Zhu was able to regroup. He declared himself the Emperor of Chu and put Ma and Lü under siege at Nanyang (南陽, in modern Nanyang, Henan), capturing the city and killing Ma. Lü died in the siege.

It was said that, at this point, Zhu had some 200,000 men, and he roamed in the region, capturing cities and taking their food storage. Even before he finished consuming the food, however, he would leave, and before doing so would burn the remaining food. As a result, people in the region suffered from starvation. Eventually, food supplies in the region ran low, as Zhu's troops also did not plant crops or grow them. Zhu then encouraged his soldiers to eat women and infants, stating, "Human flesh is the most delicious flesh. As long as there are people around, we need not worry about hunger." He also ordered the cities under his control to deliver old people and children to his camps to be consumed. The cities could not accept these orders and rebelled against him. In spring 619, Yang Shilin (楊士林) and Tian Zan (田瓚), leaders of the gentry at Huai'an (淮安, in modern Zhumadian, Henan), attacked him, and the other cities joined them. They defeated Zhu, who then gathered his remaining troops and fled to Jutan (菊潭, in modern Nanyang). He subsequently sent messengers to submit to Tang. Emperor Gaozu created him the Prince of Chu, and subsequently sent his official Duan Que (段確) to greet Zhu.

== Defeat and death ==
Duan Que, who was known for binge-drinking, arrived in Jutan in summer 619. One day, after a feast where both he and Zhu Can were drunk, Duan, intending to insult Zhu, asked, "I heard that you liked to eat human flesh. What does human flesh taste like?" Zhu responded, "An alcoholic human's flesh tastes like wine-marinated pork." Duan, insulted by the response, cursed Zhu, "You bandit! Once you get to the capital [i.e., the Tang capital Chang'an], you will be just a slave; how can you commit cannibalism then?" Zhu responded by arresting Duan and his followers, cooking them and eating their flesh. After he woke from his drunkenness, however, he realized that he had effectively broken with Tang, and he fled to Luoyang, where Wang Shichong made him a general. He continued to serve Wang after Wang seized the throne from Yang Tong later that year, ending Sui and establishing a new state of Zheng.

In 620, Tang's emperor Gaozu commissioned his second son Li Shimin to attack Zheng, and by 621, Wang was forced to surrender. Li Shimin spared Wang, but put a number of his high-level officials, including Zhu, to death. It was said that the people of Luoyang despised and abominated Zhu for his cruelty, and after his death threw rocks at his body in such great numbers that they soon piled up like a tomb.
