= Hulao Pass =

Mountain pass in Henan, China

- Location within Henan Location within Northern China Location within China
- Traversed by: G30, Henan Provincial Road S315

Location
- Location: Xingyang, Henan, China
- Range: Mount Song
- Coordinates: 34.847°N 113.199°E

Hulao Pass
- Traditional Chinese: 虎牢關
- Simplified Chinese: 虎牢关
- Literal meaning: Tiger Cage Pass
Transcriptions
Standard Mandarin
- Hanyu Pinyin: Hǔláo Guān

Hulao Pass (traditional Chinese: 虎牢關; simplified Chinese: 虎牢关; pinyin: Hǔláo Guān; lit. 'Tiger Cage Pass') is a choke point northwest of Xingyang, Henan province, China in the foothills of Mount Song. It is the site of many historical battles, being the eastern guard for the capital Luoyang for several dynasties. With Mount Song to the south, the Yellow River to the north, the pass holds up a formidable defense. Many defensive structures have been set up here throughout history, dating from the Warring States period when a checkpoint is set up here. The pass became fortified in the Tang dynasty.

The name Hulao, or "Tiger Cage", came to be when King Mu of Zhou trapped a tiger in this place. It also had the name of Wulao Pass (武牢關) at one time in the Tang dynasty, due to a naming taboo — the grandfather of Emperor Gaozu of Tang was named Li Hu. The pass also held the name Sishui Pass (汜水關) from time to time, which brought much confusion whether Hulao Pass and Sishui Pass are referring to the same pass. Luo Guanzhong, the author of Romance of the Three Kingdoms, apparently also got confused over the names and treated Sishui Pass and Hulao Pass as two places when they should be one.

Numerous battles were said to have been fought here. Among the most famous is the Battle of Hulao Pass, where a coalition of dissidents led by Yuan Shao clashed with Dong Zhuo's elite armies in the novel Romance of the Three Kingdoms. Also here, in the Battle of Hulao of 621, Li Shimin defeated Dou Jiande and forced Wang Shichong to surrender, laying the foundation to the Tang dynasty. The classic novel Fengshen Yanyi (set over a thousand years before the Three Kingdoms period) depicts two major battles taking place in this pass (in chapters 33 & 76).
