= Yang Xuangan =

Chinese general and politician (died 613)

Yang Xuangan (Chinese: 楊玄感; pinyin: Yáng Xuángǎn; died 21 August 613) was a Chinese military general and politician who lived during the Sui dynasty. He was the son of Yang Su, a military general and politician himself. As he knew that Emperor Yang was apprehensive of his father, he was never quite secure. In 613, when Emperor Yang was attacking Goguryeo, he rebelled near the eastern capital Luoyang but was soon quelled and defeated. He ordered his brother Yang Jishan (楊積善) to kill him, so as not to fall into Emperor Yang's hands.

== Background ==
It is not known when Yang Xuangan was born. He was the oldest son of Yang Su, who was already a major general at the start of the Sui dynasty in 581 but whose honors and power grew as the years went by. Yang Xuangan was considered by some to be developmentally disabled while in his childhood, but his father believed that not to be the case. As he grew, he was studious and known for his strength and martial skills, and was particularly skillful at mounted archery, as well as the use of spears. In the Book of Sui, Yang Xuangan was described as a courageous and stalwart man with a shiny and thick beard. Because of his father's accomplishments, Yang Xuangan was repeatedly honored by Sui's founder Emperor Wen as well. In 589, after his father's contributions in the conquest of the Chen dynasty, which allowed Sui to unite China, Yang Xuangan was given the honorific office of Yitong Sansi (儀同三司, fifth rank, first division, in Sui's system of nine ranks with two divisions each). Unlike several of his brothers, Yang Xuangan was not created a ducal title, as he was his father's heir apparent and expected to eventually inherit his father's title. In 602, after Yang Su's victory over Tujue, Yang Xuangan was promoted to Zhuguo (柱國, second rank, first division) -- the same rank that his father was at, and at imperial gatherings, father and son stood in the same area. Soon thereafter, Emperor Wen demoted Yang Xuangan down to third rank, and Yang Xuangan thanked Emperor Wen appropriately, "I did not know that Your Imperial Majesty would give me this much favor -- so that I can show respect to my father in public as much as I do in private."

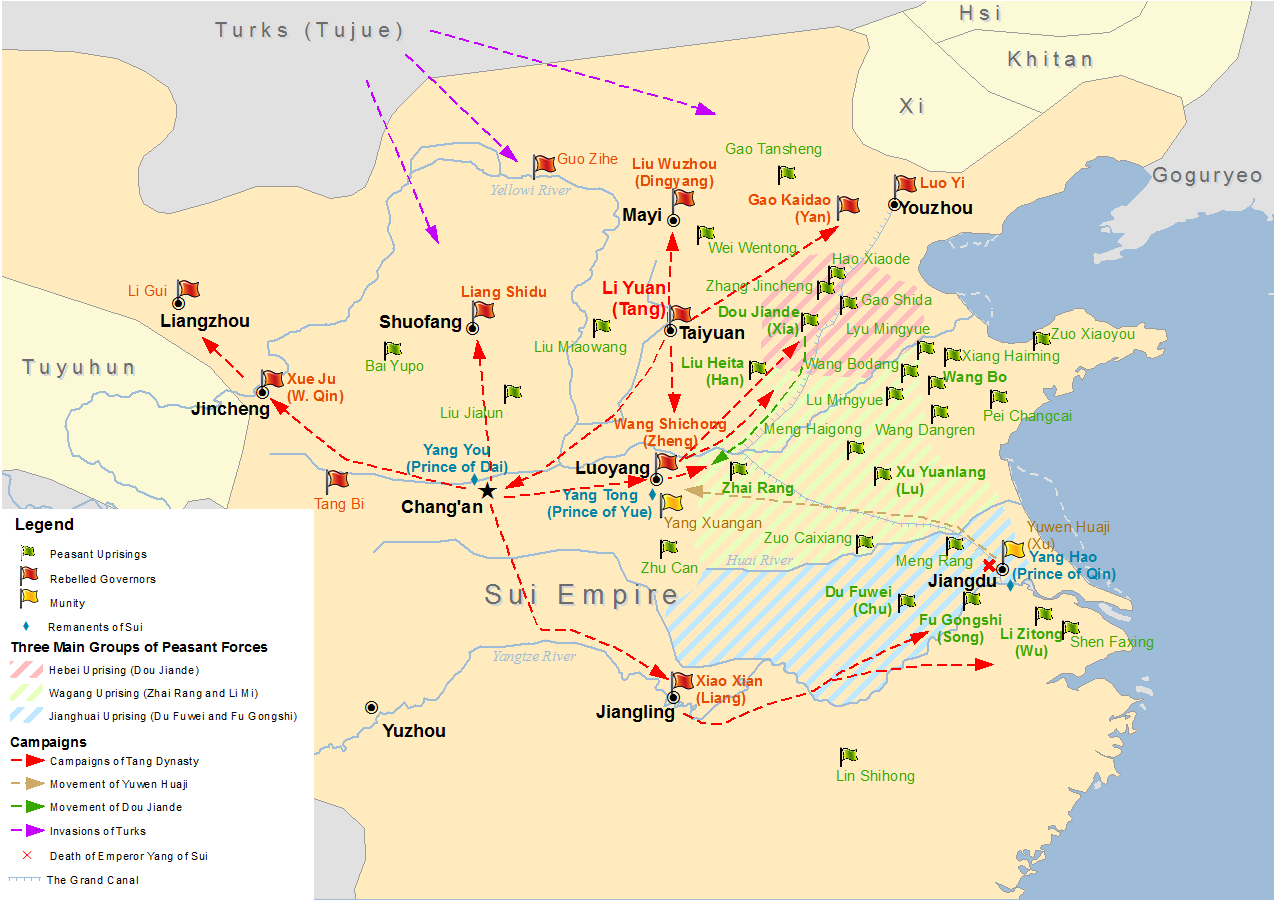
Map showing major uprisings and rebellions in the last years of Sui dynasty.

During Emperor Wen's reign, Yang Xuangan served as the governor of Ying Province (郢州, roughly modern Wuhan, Hubei), and was said to be an effective monitor of his subordinate officials, finding out both their good deeds and evil deeds and rewarding or punishing them appropriately. He later served as the governor of Song Province (宋州, roughly modern Shangqiu, Henan), but while still at that position, his father Yang Su died in 604. He inherited his father's highly honored title of Duke of Chu, and he left governmental service to observe a mourning period. After about a year, he became a minister in the government of Emperor Wen's successor Emperor Yang. He was said to be arrogant but a patron of literary talents, and many talented people became his guests. He particularly trusted Li Mi, also from a noble house.

While Yang Su was alive, Emperor Yang had been deeply apprehensive of Yang Su's power and angry with Yang Su's arrogance, and after Yang Su's death, he made the comment, "If Yang Su did not die, his clan would have eventually been exterminated." Yang Xuangan heard rumors of this comment and was apprehensive of Emperor Yang. As he saw how the imperial governance had deteriorated under Emperor Yang and believed how many officials who were prior subordinates of his father Yang Su would support him, he plotted to depose Emperor Yang and declaring Emperor Yang's nephew Yang Hao the Prince of Qin emperor. As he followed Emperor Yang on a campaign against Tuyuhun in 609, he saw how disorganized the emperor's train was and considered an ambush at that point, but his uncle Yang Shen (楊慎) dissuaded him from the action. Later, during Emperor Yang's preparation for war against Goguryeo, Yang Xuangan volunteered to serve, and his volunteering greatly pleased Emperor Yang, who trusted him more and more and gave him input in important governmental matters.

== Rebellion ==
In 613, as Emperor Yang was launching his second campaign against Goguryeo, he put Yang Xuangan in charge of ensuring food supplies at the important shipping junction of Liyang (黎陽, in modern Hebi, Henan). Yang Xuangan withheld the food supply ships, and then, in summer 613, occupied Liyang and declared an uprising, initially declaring that the general Lai Hu'er had revolted and that he was attacking Lai, but soon also declaring that he was restoring the laws of the time of Emperor Wen, signifying a repudiation of Emperor Yang. He soon publicly denounced Emperor Yang of misrule and tyranny, and immediately drew popular support in the region as well as the strongest shipping laborers and sailors. He summoned Li Mi and his brother Yang Xuanting (楊玄挺) from the capital Chang'an, and his brothers Yang Xuanzong (楊玄縱) and Yang Wandan (楊萬石) from the Goguryeo front, but Yang Wandan was captured and executed. Yang Xuangan made Li Mi his chief strategist, and Li Mi gave him three options, in the order of Li's opinion as to their feasibility:

1. Li's "high strategy" involved making a surprise attack on Jicheng (modern Beijing) and Linyu (臨榆, in modern Qinhuangdao, Hebei), capturing those key locations to trap Emperor Yang, who then was on the Goguryeo front. Li believed that Goguryeo would then make a crippling attack on Emperor Yang, and that Emperor Yang's forces would either collapse on their own or surrender.
2. Li's "middle strategy" involved making a surprise attack on Chang'an and capturing the surrounding Guanzhong region, and then holding the region and preparing for confrontation with Emperor Yang.
3. Li's "low strategy" involved making a surprise attack on the eastern capital Luoyang and trying to capture it quickly and hold it as the command center. However, he warned that Tang Hui (唐褘), who had initially submitted to Yang Xuangan but who had since fled back to Luoyang, might have already warned the city to firm up its defenses—and that if Yang Xuangan put Luoyang under siege and could not capture it quickly, he would soon be trapped by converging Sui forces.

Yang Xuangan, however, believing that he needed to capture Luoyang to show that his rebellion was serious, commented that Li's "low strategy" was in fact "high strategy," and headed toward Luoyang. However, as Li had predicted, Tang had warned Emperor Yang's grandson Yang Tong the Prince of Yue and the official Fan Zigai (樊子蓋), whom Emperor Yang left in charge of Luoyang, and Luoyang's defenses had been prepared. While Yang Xuangan and his brothers gained some victories, he could not quickly capture Luoyang. Meanwhile, many young noblemen were joining his cause. After he captured the highly regarded official Wei Fusi (韋福嗣), he trusted Wei as well and did not only trust Li any further, but strategies that Wei submitted were not wholeheartedly in support of the rebellion. Li requested that Yang Xuangan kill Wei, but Yang Xuangan refused. Li made the comment to his relatives, "The Duke of Chu wanted to rebel, but does not know how to gain final victory. We are now like turtles stuck in urns."

At this time, Emperor Yang was sieging Liaodong (遼東, in modern Liaoyang, Liaoning), and had nearly captured it from Goguryeo forces when news of Yang Xuangan's rebellion arrived. Yang Xuangan's associate Husi Zheng (斛斯政) surrendered to Goguryeo, and Emperor Yang retreated at night. Also around the same time, Wei Wensheng (衛文昇), the official Emperor Yang left in charge of Chang'an, came to Luoyang's aid with his troops, and Lai also arrived. Further, the forward forces returning from the Goguryeo front, under the command of Yuwen Shu and Qutu Tong, soon arrived as well, and while Yang Xuangan attempted to prevent them from crossing the Yellow River, attacks from Fan prevented Yang Xuangan from being able to cut Qutu and Yuwen off at the Yellow River, allowing them to cross. Yang Xuangan was soon losing battles, and under the suggestion of Li Zixiong (李子雄) and Li Mi, he decided to falsely declare that Yuan Hongsi (元弘嗣), the general in command at Honghua (弘化, in modern Qingyang, Gansu), was joining his cause, and that he was going to meet with Yuan.

In fall 613, Yang Xuangan thus lifted the siege on Luoyang, and headed west. On the way, however, he was tempted by the people of Hongnong (弘農, in modern Sanmenxia, Henan), who opined that Hongnong would be easily captured and could be held. Further, the governor of Hongnong Commandery, Emperor Yang's cousin Yang Zhiji (楊智積) the Prince of Cai, was intentionally insulting Yang Xuangan to enrage him. In anger, Yang Xuangan put Hongnong under siege, despite Li Mi's pleas that he was endangering his campaign by proceeding slowly. Yang Xuangan put Hongnong under siege for three days but could not capture it, and therefore had to continue to head west. By this point, the Sui forces commanded by Yuwen, Wei, Lai, and Qutu had caught up to him, and were dealing him defeats, and his forces collapsed. Yang Xuangan and his brother Yang Jishan fled to Jialurong (葭蘆戎, also in modern Sanmenxia) on foot, and Yang Xuangan, realizing that they were about to be captured and not wanting to be captured, asked Yang Jishan to kill him. Yang Jishan did so, and then tried to commit suicide, but before he could die, he was captured and delivered to Emperor Yang, along with Yang Xuangan's head. Emperor Yang ordered that Yang Xuangan's body be cut into pieces and then ground and burned. All of Yang Xuangan's brothers were executed.
