= Denis Twitchett =

British sinologist (1925–2006)

Denis C. Twitchett
- Born: 23 September 1925; London, England
- Died: 24 February 2006 (aged 80); Cambridge, England
- Education: University of Cambridge
- Known for: Medieval Chinese history
- Scientific career
- Fields: Chinese history
- Workplaces: University of London, Cambridge, Princeton
- Notable students: Wang Gungwu

Chinese name
- Chinese: 杜希德
Transcriptions
Standard Mandarin
- Hanyu Pinyin: Dù Xīdé
- Wade–Giles: Tu^{4} Hsi^{1}-tê^{2}
Yue: Cantonese
- Yale Romanization: Douh Hēi Dāk
- Jyutping: Dou^{6} Hei^{1} Dak^{1}

Denis Crispin Twitchett (23 September 1925 – 24 February 2006) was a British Sinologist and historian, and is well known as one of the co-editors of The Cambridge History of China.

== Biography ==
Denis Twitchett was born on 23 September 1925 in London, England, the son of an architectural draughtsman, and attended Isleworth County Grammar School. During World War II he took a crash course in Japanese, and for the remainder of the war he was part of the Bletchley Park operations acting as a listener at one of the forward listening stations in Sri Lanka. He also spent a great deal of time in Japan, and was able to learn from the best Japanese historians of China (who tended to focus on Tang China, a period which became his field of expertise also). Following demobilisation he read Modern Chinese at the School of Oriental and African Studies at the University of London for a year (1946–47). Having won a scholarship to read Geography in 1943 while still a school pupil, he then took up his place at St Catharine's College, Cambridge, whence he graduated with a first-class degree in Oriental Studies in 1950.

He was a lecturer at the University of London (1954–56) and Cambridge (1956–60), the Chair of Chinese at the universities of London (1960–68) and Cambridge (1968–80), and the Gordon Wu '58 Professor of Chinese Studies at Princeton University (1980–94). He was a fellow of the British Academy from 1967. He greatly expanded the role of Chinese studies in Western intellectual circles.

He married Umeko Ichikawa in 1956. Together they had two children.

== The Cambridge History of China ==
Starting in 1966, Professor Twitchett and historian John K. Fairbank (who taught at Harvard) began plans for the first comprehensive history of China to be published in the English language. Originally expected to be a six volume set of books, the series expanded as time passed and eventually grew to the currently planned 15 volumes. While he was at Princeton, Twitchett worked closely with fellow Sinologist Frederick W. Mote (who had a related wartime experience).

Drawing upon historians for individual chapters of the books, the series (though still missing one volume as of 2022) is considered a history of China. Twitchett wrote many sections and guided the creation of the whole series from the start until his death.

Twitchett deliberately held off creating a book on China before the Qin dynasty because, as Twitchett put it in the preface to Volume 7, there was still so much work to be done on the period. Since that time the history has become better understood and in 1999 a companion volume The Cambridge History of Ancient China, From the Origins of Civilization to 221 BC edited by Michael Loewe and Edward L. Shaughnessy was published.

== Other publications ==
- Denis Twitchett (1962). Arthur F. Wright, Denis Twitchett (ed.). Lu Chih (754-805) : Imperial Adviser and Court Official. Confucian Personalities. Stanford University Press. p. 84. ISBN 1-896951-88-0.
- Financial Administration under the T'ang Dynasty (Cambridge University Press, 1963)
- Printing and Publishing in Medieval China (London: The Wynkyn de Worde Society, 1983)
- The Writing of Official History Under the T'ang (Cambridge University Press, 1992)
- (with P.J.M. Geelan) The Times Atlas of China (London: The Times Publishing Company Ltd., 1974)

Twitchett was the expert who helped create the China maps for The Times Atlas of World History (first published in 1979).
