= Heroes in Sui and Tang Dynasties =

Chinese television series

- Poster
- Also known as: Sui Tang Yanyi; Heroes of Sui and Tang
- Genre: Historical drama
- Written by: Shan Tianfang
- Directed by: Chung Siu-hung
- Creative director: Cheng Lidong
- Presented by: Cheng Lidong; Shan Tianfang; Xu Yan
- Starring: Kevin Yan; Hans Zhang; Jiang Wu; Du Chun; Fu Dalong; Wang Like; Bai Bing
- Opening theme: Wuxing Yao (五行谣) performed by Xuri Yanggang
- Ending theme: Yanghua Lishu (杨花李树) performed by Sun Nan
- Composer: Zhou Zhiyong
- Country of origin: China
- Original language: Mandarin
- No. of episodes: 62

Production
- Executive producer: Cheng Lidong
- Producer: Guo Jianyong
- Production location: China
- Running time: 48 minutes per episode
- Production companies: Zhejiang Yongle Film & TV Production

Original release
- Network: Dragon TV; Shandong STV; Shenzhen STV; Hebei TV; Zhejiang TV
- Release: 14 January – 6 February 2013

Heroes in Sui and Tang Dynasties
- Simplified Chinese: 隋唐演义
- Traditional Chinese: 隋唐演義
- Hanyu Pinyin: Suí Táng Yǎnyì
Transcriptions
Standard Mandarin
- Hanyu Pinyin: Suí Táng Yǎnyì

Heroes in Sui and Tang Dynasties is a Chinese television series based on Chu Renhuo's historical novel Sui Tang Yanyi, which romanticises the historical events leading to the fall of the Sui dynasty and the rise of the Tang dynasty. The series was first broadcast in mainland China on various television networks on 14 January 2013. It is not to be confused with Heroes of Sui and Tang Dynasties 1 & 2, a similar television series also based on the novel, but was released earlier in December 2012. Filming for the series started on 5 November 2011 at the Hengdian World Studios and wrapped up in May 2012.

== Cast ==
- Yan Kuan as Qin Qiong
- Hans Zhang as Luo Cheng
- Jiang Wu as Cheng Yaojin
- Du Chun as Li Shimin (Emperor Taizong of Tang)
- Fu Dalong as Yang Guang (Emperor Yang of Sui)
- Wang Like as Yang Yu'er (Princess Yu)
- Bai Bing as Empress Xiao
- Tang Yixin as Shan Yingying
- Wang Baoqiang as Li Yuanba
- Chen Hao as Yuwen Chengdu
- Hu Dong as Shan Xiongxin
- Yin Xiaotian as Yuchi Gong
- Norman Chui as Yuwen Huaji
- Liu Xiaoxiao as Pei Cuiyun
- Liu Zi Jiao as Hua Da Jiao (Cheng Yao Jin's wife)
- Bobo Gan as Dongfang Yumei
- Siqin Gaowa as Madam Mo (Cheng Yaojin's mother)
- Juanzi as Madam Ning (Qin Qiong's mother)
- Wang Jianxin as Luo Yi
- Zhou Jie as Qin Shengzhu
- Kou Zhenhai as Li Yuan (Emperor Gaozu of Tang)
- Kent Tong as Yang Jian (Emperor Wen of Sui)
- Song Jia as Dugu Qieluo
- Du Yiheng as Xu Maogong
- Wu Qingzhe as Li Mi
- Wang Yizhu as Empress Dou
- Xiao Rongsheng as Yang Lin (Lord Mount)
- Zhang Haoxiang as Wang Bodang
- Wang Junhe as Pei Yuanqing
- Sang Ping as Luo Shixin
- Shi Tianshuo as Chai Shao
- Shi Tiangeng as Wei Zheng
- Zhang Dianfei as Li Yuanji
- Mou Fengbin as Zhai Rang
- Chen Zhihui as Ding Yanping
- Li Xuesong as Xie Yingdeng
- Zhou Fang as Lady Xuanhua
- Zhang Mingming as Wang Junke
- Zhang Ying as You Junda
- Xie Ning as Qi Guoyuan
- Song Leitao as Li Ruhui
- Liu Changde as Luo Song
- Liu Yidan as Dou Xianniang
- Hong Jiantao as Chen Shubao
- Li Donghan as Wu Yunzhao
- Wu Xiaomin as Hong Fu Nü
- Du Haitao as Lai Hu'er
- Zhang Su as Li Jiancheng
- Li Qingxiang as Wang Shichong
- Ren Xuehai as Tang Bi
- Huang Yonggang as Xiong Kuohai
- Liu Bingfeng as Wu Tianxi
- Cao Jun as Han Qinhu
- Ji Hongzhang as He Ruobi
- Li Yihan as Ma Ting; Shan An
- Miao Haizhong as Yang Yong
- Liu Mengmeng as Princess Qionghua
- Choenyi Tsering as Zhang Lihua; Zhu Gui'er
- Liu Can as Fan Hu
- Cao Zichen as Zhang Gongjin
- Cui Bin as Bai Xiandao
- Hu Sutong as Du Wenzhong
- Gong Sile as Jin Cheng
- Lou Yanru as Niu Gai
- Zhang Xin as Yuwen Chenglong
- Zhuang Xiabo as Luo Jia
- Liu Yanyu as Luo Fang
- Shi Chuan as Xue Liang; Chen Changyu
- Ban Jinghui as Gao Ming
- Zhu Rongrong as Shangguan Di
- Zhu Jiazhen as Li Zhong
- Zhou Zhong as Ma Shumou
- Yuan Shuai as Wang Guangyin
- Wang Haocheng as Shan Mian
- Chengmen Lixue as Shan Xiaoxue
- Wu Chengjun as Shan Zhou
- Qi Qinglin as Qiu Rui
- Guo Jun as Wu Jianzhang
- Meng Yansen as Qin Yong
- Zhang Chunzhong as Xin Wenli
- Guan Yu as Li Jing
- Yu Jia'na as Hei Yuenu
- Li Mengyang as Bai Yuejiao
- Lai Jiatong as Pei Yuanshao
- Tanqing Shuoxi as Liu Dapeng
- Min Zheng as Wu Kui
- Hou Jie as Wu Liang
- Gao Ruigang as Wu Anfu
- Gao Hongliang as Dongfang Bai
- Chen Chen as Dongfang Yumu
- Ren Xiaowei as Yuwen Kang
- Ma Yanbin as Master Wukong
- Wang Xiaoqian as Xiaoling
- Wang Yingshan as Xiaoyu

== Featured songs ==
- Wuxing Yao (五行谣) performed by Xuri Yanggang (旭日阳刚)
- Yang Hua Li Shu (杨花李树) performed by Sun Nan

== International broadcasts ==
Region	Network	Premiere date	Title
China	Hebei TV	January 14, 2013	隋唐演义 (Sui Tang Yan Yi)
China	Shandong TV	January 14, 2013	隋唐演义 (Sui Tang Yan Yi)
China	Dragon TV	January 14, 2013	隋唐演义 (Sui Tang Yan Yi)
China	Zhejiang TV	January 14, 2013	隋唐演义 (Sui Tang Yan Yi)
China	Shenzhen TV	January 14, 2013	隋唐演义 (Sui Tang Yan Yi)
Republic of China (Taiwan)	CTS Main Channel	March 11, 2013	隋唐演義 (Sui Tang Yanyi)
Republic of China (Taiwan)	EYE TV DRAMA	October 24, 2013	隋唐演義 (Sui Tang Yanyi)
Malaysia	Astro Quan Jia HD	March 19, 2013	隋唐演义 (Sui Tang Yanyi)
South Korea	Chunghwa TV	April 29, 2013	수당연의 (Su Dang Yeon Ee)
Hong Kong	Drama 2	November 19, 2013	隋唐演義 (Cheoi Tong Yinyi)
Hong Kong	TVB HD Jade	June 20, 2014	隋唐演義 (Cheoi Tong Yinyi)
United Kingdom	TVB Europe	April 28, 2014	Heroes in Sui and Tang Dynasties
Australia	TVBJ	April 29, 2014	Heroes in Sui and Tang Dynasties
Thailand	new)tv	August 2, 2014	วีรบุรุษกู้พิภพ (Weera Buruth Koo Pipob)
Japan	Channel Ginga	October 19, 2015	隋唐演義 (Zui Tou Engi)
