= Five Tiger Generals =

Term in Chinese culture

- Traditional Chinese: 五虎將
- Simplified Chinese: 五虎将
Transcriptions
Standard Mandarin
- Hanyu Pinyin: Wǔ Hǔ Jiàng
Yue: Cantonese
- Jyutping: Ng5 Fu2 Zoeng3

The Five Tiger Generals is a popular appellation in Chinese culture for the top five military commanders serving under one lord. Although the term does not appear in Chinese historical records and is not used officially, it has been heavily used in literature texts, folklore, as well as popular culture.

== Three Kingdoms ==
=== Romance of the Three Kingdoms ===
As a romanticized novel based on the history of the Three Kingdoms period, the historical novel Romance of the Three Kingdoms refers to Guan Yu, Zhang Fei, Huang Zhong, Ma Chao and Zhao Yun as the "Five Tiger Generals" of Shu Han, one of the Three Kingdoms, led by warlord Liu Bei. In the literature, Liu Bei initially appointed Guan Yu as General Who Destroys Rebels and Lord of Hanshou, Zhang Fei as General Who Subdues Rebels and Lord of Xin, Huang Zhong as General Who Conquers the West, Ma Chao as General Who Pacifies the West, and Zhao Yun General Who Guards the West, and promoted them to "Five Tiger Generals" later.

==== Guan Yu ====
Guan Yu is one of Liu Bei's strongest generals in the novel. Together with Zhang Fei, he started following Liu Bei's leadership at a very early stage of Liu Bei's career, at which time the Han dynasty was experiencing the large-scale Yellow Turban Rebellion. He joined a militia that was led by Liu Bei, funded by local business groups in Zhuo County. He impressed Liu Bei at their first meet-up due to his physical strength and outgoing personality, and quickly formed a brotherly relationship with Liu Bei and Zhang Fei. He rose from fighting Yellow Turbans, commanded Liu Bei's navy, conquered Changsha, governed Jing Province, expanded Shu Han's territory to Cao Wei-controlled Fancheng. Throughout his career, Guan Yu participated numerous battles against Cao Wei led by Cao Cao and Eastern Wu led by Sun Quan, and played a critical role in establishment of Shu Han. Due to the might of his arm and his chivalry, Guan Yu is divinized after his death, representing bravery, power, loyalty, righteousness, as well as brotherhood.

==== Zhang Fei ====
Zhang Fei is one of Liu Bei's strongest generals in the novel. Together with Guan Yu, he started following Liu Bei's leadership at a very early stage of Liu Bei's career, at which time Empire Han was experiencing the Yellow Turban Rebellion. He joined a militia that was led by Liu Bei, funded by local business groups in Zhuo County. He impressed Liu Bei at their first meet-up due to his physical strength and outgoing personality, and quickly formed a brotherly relationship with Liu Bei and Guan Yu. He rose from fighting rebels in Yellow Turban Rebellion, conquered Ba Commandery, captured multiple cities cross in the area around present-day Sichuan and Chongqing, built a solid foundation for Liu Bei's establishment of Shu Han.

==== Huang Zhong ====
Prior to joining Liu Bei's force, Huang Zhong served under Han Xuan in the novel as an Associate General in Changsha. When Liu Bei delegated Guan Yu to conquer Changsha, Han Xuan somehow suspected that Huang Zhong was persuaded by Guan Yu to be a traitor despite Huang Zhong's fighting on the battlefield against Guan Yu, and arrested him for execution. Huang Zhong's fellow military comrades organized a revolution to save his life, killed Han Xuan, and surrendered to Guan Yu. After joining Shu Han, Huang Zhong defeated Xiahou Yuan of Cao Wei in the Battle of Mount Dingjun, and thus secured Shu Han's northern border.

==== Ma Chao ====
Ma Chao rose to fame when he led his father Ma Teng's army to fight barbarians in Liang Province. He was nicknamed "Ma Chao the Splendid" for his magnificent armor and grand skill as a warrior. In the novel, shortly after his family was murdered by Cao Cao, Ma Chao and his cousin Ma Dai joined Zhang Lu's force to revenge Cao Cao, and then joined Liu Bei's force following Zhang Lu's surrender to Cao Cao. As Ma Chao had established an extraordinary military achievements when he fought Qiang barbarians since his early years, he continued to be Liu Bei's mightiest general that protected Shu Han's northwestern border from Qiang barbarians.

==== Zhao Yun ====
Zhao Yun, also known as Zhao Zilong, fought together with Liu Bei as an ally during Liu Bei's early career, leaving a very close relationship with each other in the novel. Finally when Zhao Yun and Liu Bei met in Ye, Zhao Yun decided that he would follow Liu Bei's leadership for the rest of his life. During his career with Liu Bei's force, Zhao Yun protected Liu Bei's family, and saved Shu Han's crown prince Liu Shan from numerous battles. Zhao Yun's most legendary battle was to save Liu Shan, who was an infant at the time, from Cao Cao's encirclement. During the Battle of Changban, isolated by Cao Cao's army, Zhao Yun held Liu Shan in his armor, slew more than 70 enemy warriors alone, and escaped the scene without disturbing the infant's sleep. In Shu Han, Zhao Yun led Liu Bei's royal guards, ensured the safety of the royal family, and kept the capital city in peace.

=== Historicity ===
Historically, Liu Bei never assigned any title similar to the "Five Tiger Generals", but instead did appoint them to titles of the same military ranking: Guan Yu as General of Front, Zhang Fei as General of Right, Huang Zhong as General of Rear, Ma Chao as General of Left, and Zhao Yun as General of Center. In the official historical text Records of the Three Kingdoms, the historian Chen Shou grouped them into one volume due to their similar military titles.

==== Relative accomplishments ====
Some historians that study the history of the Three Kingdoms periods argue that while Guan Yu, Zhang Fei, Huang Zhong, Ma Chao and Zhao Yun were appointed to the similar military rankings and were listed in the same volume in the historical texts, their military achievements are significantly differed, and people referring those five generals as "Five Tiger Generals" presume that they share the same accomplishments. Kaiyu Luo of Sichuan University argues that while Guan Yu had led armies of over 200,000 soldiers to expand Shu Han's territory, Zhao Yun had never stepped out of Shu Han's capital city in his military career: it does not make sense to presume Guan Yu and Zhao Yun had the same level of achievements or to group them together under one "Five Tiger Generals" ranking.

Researchers who support this grouping pointed out that Zhao Yun's core responsibility was to ensure the safety of Shu Han's central government, and historically this role could only be assigned to the most reliable commander. It is important to raise the awareness that protecting the kingdom is the same important as expanding territory, and it is reasonable for Chen Shou to list Zhao Yun in the same volume of Guan Yu, and for people to refer both Zhao Yun and Guan Yu as members of "Five Tiger Generals".

== In Water Margin ==
In the classical novel Water Margin, five of the 108 outlaws at Liangshan Marsh – Guan Sheng, Lin Chong, Qin Ming, Huyan Zhuo and Dong Ping – are ranked as the "Five Tiger Generals" of the Liangshan cavalry.

=== Guan Sheng ===
In the literature, Guan Sheng, nicknamed as Great Blade (大刀), first appears in Vol. 63. According to the literature, Guan Sheng is Guan Yu's direct descendant, inheriting the same physical appearance of Guan Yu, and using the same weapon as Guan Yu used. Guan Sheng was initially appointed by Cai Jing to lead government force to attack Liangshan Marsh, but surrendered to Liangshan after defeated by Liangshan's Huyan Zhuo. After he joined Liangshan, Guan Sheng captured Shan Tinggui and Wei Dingguo of the Song government force, and was ranked as #5 out of 108 outlaws. Guan Sheng's official military title in Liangshan Marsh is "General of the Left of the Five Tiger Generals of Cavalry".

Portraits of the Five Tiger Generals of the novel Water Margin by the Qing dynasty artist Zhang Lin:
Guan Sheng

Lin Chong

Qin Ming

Huyan Zhuo

Dong Ping

== In other literature ==
In the historical novel Shuo Tang, the rebellion force of Wagang Army has “Five Tiger Generals”: Qin Shubao, Shan Xiongxin, Cheng Yaojin, Wang Bodang and Luo Cheng.

The Qing dynasty writer Li Yutang named Di Qing, Shi Yu, Zhang Zhong, Li Yi, and Liu Qing as the "Five Tiger Generals" in his works Romance of Di Qing, The Five Tigers Conquer the West, and The Five Tigers Pacify the South.

In Heroes of the Ming Dynasty, a novel romanticising the events leading to the founding of the Ming dynasty, Xu Da, Tang He, Chang Yuchun, Hu Dahai, and Mu Ying are named the "Five Founding Tiger Generals of Ming".

== Cultural impact ==
In present-day terminology, "Five Tiger Generals" can refer to any group of five that is particularly outstanding in a certain field.

Hsiao Shou-li, Chiang Wu-tung, Chiao Tsai-pao, Chen Chun-sheng, and Su Teng-wang are called "Five Tiger Generals" of Taiwanese opera.

Taiwanese politicians Kuo Yu-hsin, Lee Wan-chu, Kuo Kuo-chi, Lee Yuan-chan, and Wu San-lien are called the "Five Tiger Generals" of the Taiwan Provincial Consultative Council. Together with female politician Hsu Shih-hsien, the six of them are called "Five Dragons, One Phoenix".

In the 1980s and 1990s, the five hosts of the Taiwanese television channel Sanlih E-Television, He Yi-hang, Peng Chia-chia, Yang Fan, Yu Tian and Li Teng-tsai are called "Five Tiger Generals". They jointly hosted the Sanlih E-Television Gold Medal Singing Show

In the 1980s, Hong Kong television actors Felix Wong, Michael Miu, Kent Tong, Andy Lau and Tony Leung are called the "Five Tiger Generals of TVB". The five of them starred together in the 1991 film The Tigers.

In 2009, a Taiwanese musical band called Wu Hu Jiang was formed. The five members starred as the Five Tiger Generals of Shu in the television series K.O.3an Guo, which spoofs Romance of the Three Kingdoms in a modern school setting.

== See also ==
- Five Elite Generals
- Lists of people of the Three Kingdoms
