= 18 Warriors of Sui-Tang Transition =

Fictional heroes of 6th- and 7th-century China

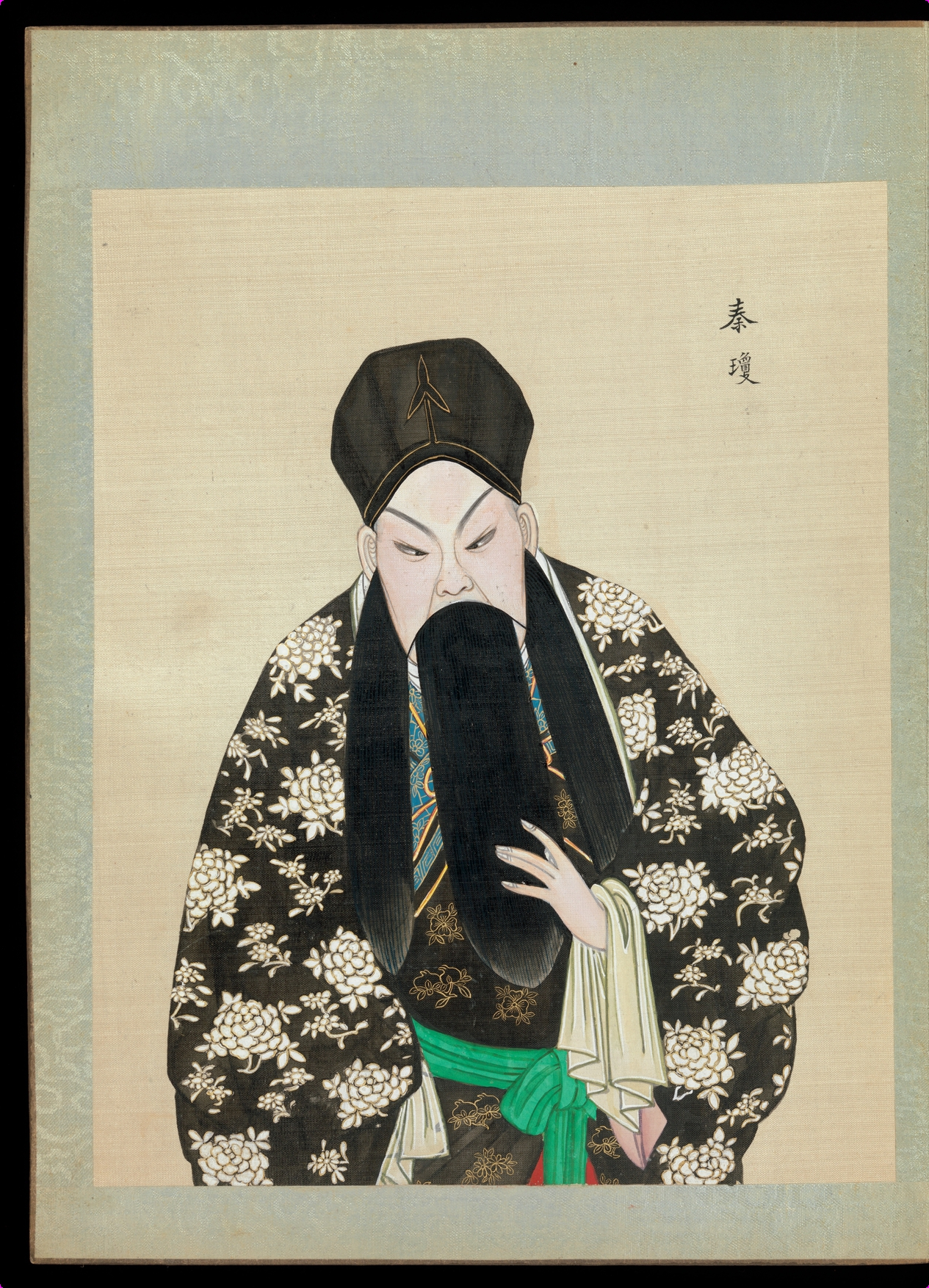
Qin Shubao

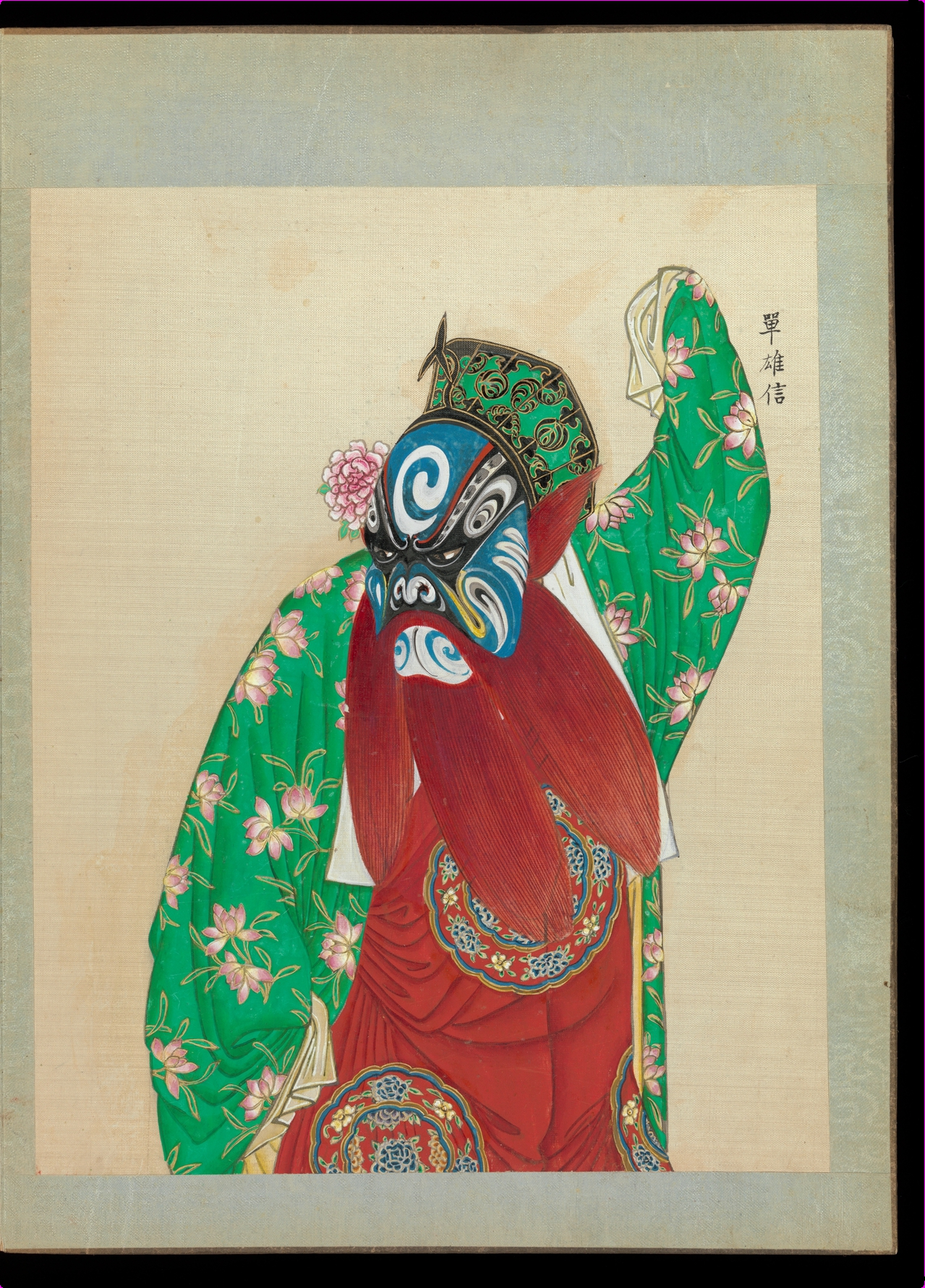
Shan Xiongxin

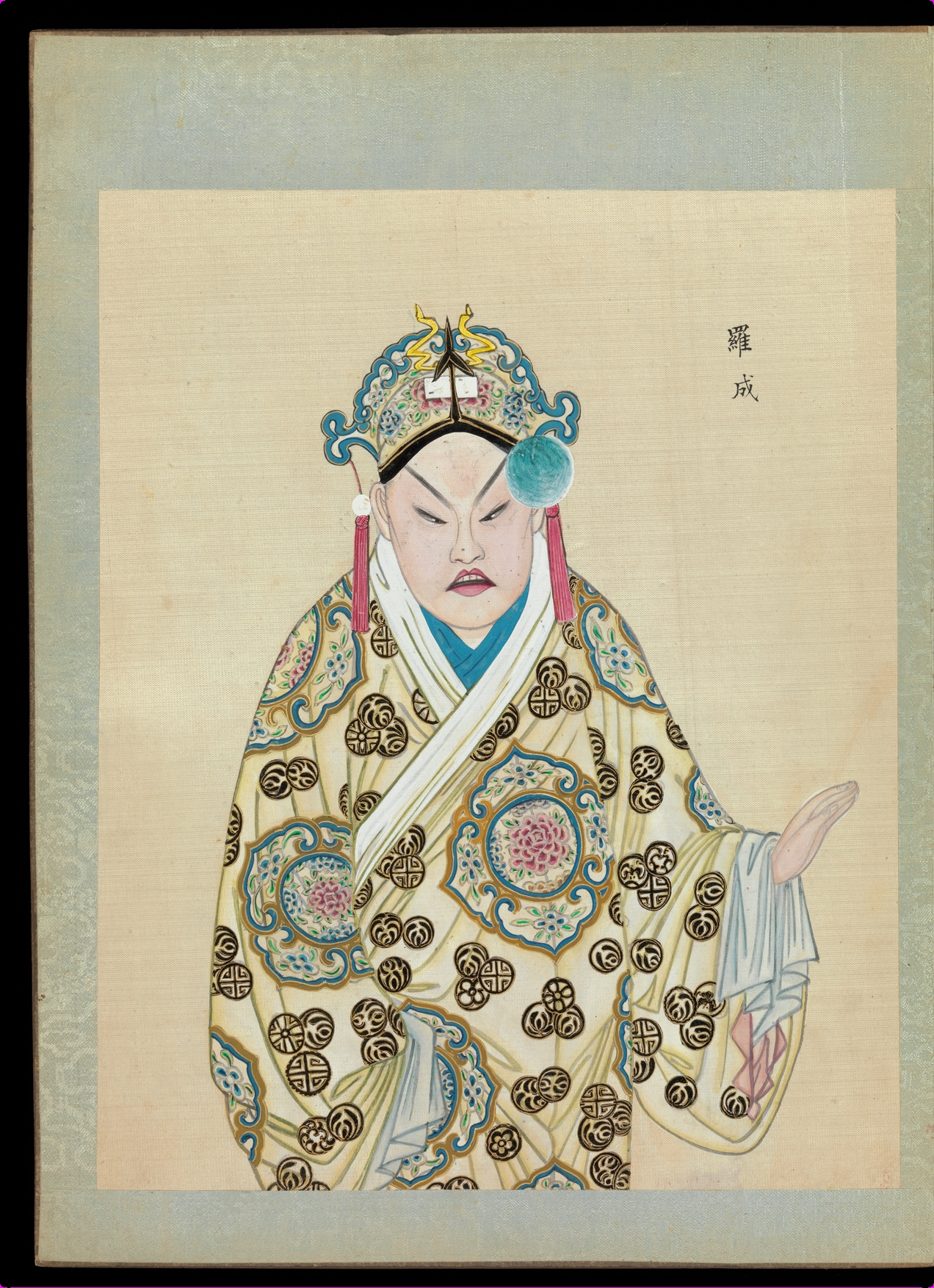
Luo Cheng

The "18 Warriors of Sui-Tang Transition" (traditional Chinese: 隋唐十八好漢; simplified Chinese: 隋唐十八好汉) are fictional legendary heroes who lived during the Sui and early Tang dynasties. The concept of the 18 Warriors was first introduced in the traditional historical novel Shuo Tang. The warriors' rankings are based on their martial arts skills and physical strength. Some of them are based on historical figures, such as Qin Shubao and Shan Xiongxin, while others were invented as folk heroes, such as Luo Cheng and Yuwen Chengdu.

== Ranking ==
The exact rankings are disputed, partly because the novel Shuo Tang only ranks 13 of the 18 warriors. In order, the 13 ranked by the book are:

1. Li Yuanba (李元霸)
2. Yuwen Chengdu (宇文成都)
3. Pei Yuanqing (裴元庆)
4. Xiong Kuohai (熊阔海)
5. Wu Yunshao (伍云召)
6. Wu Tianxi (伍天锡)
7. Luo Cheng (罗成)
8. Yang Lin (杨林)
9. Wei Wentong (魏文通)
10. Shang Shitu (尚师徒)
11. Xin Wenli (新文理)
12. N/A
13. N/A
14. N/A
15. N/A
16. Qin Shubao (秦叔宝)
17. Yuchi Gong (尉迟恭)
18. Shan Xiongxin (单雄信)

The identities of the five unnamed warriors are often disputed. Among the characters mentioned in the book, several possible figures include Yuchi Gong (尉迟恭), Wang Bodang (王伯当), Cheng Yaojin (程咬金), Hua Gongyi (华功义), Liang Shitai (梁师泰), Han Qinhu (韩擒虎), Ma Shumou (麻叔谋), and Cao Yanping (曹延平). Other historical or fictional characters from the Sui and early Tang dynasties are also potential candidates for this list, such as Zuo Tiancheng (左天成), Lai Hu'er (来护儿), Luo Shixin (罗士信), Hou Junji (侯君集), Wang Junke (王君可), Wang Bo (王薄), and Lu Mingyue (卢明月).

The most popularly accepted version of the list includes Cao Yanping, Lai Hu'er, Liang Shitai, and Zuo Tiancheng as warriors 12 through 15, and Yuchi Gong as warrior 17.

== Characters ==
=== Li Yuanba ===
==== In the novel ====
In Shuo Tang, Li Yuanba (李元霸) is portrayed as the most powerful and skillful warrior of his time. He is the fourth son of Li Yuan, the founder of the Tang dynasty. Li Yuanba possesses extraordinary physical strength, exemplified by his weapons: a pair of golden hammers weighing 400 jin(236.1 kg) each. With Li Yuanba's assistance, Li Yuan not only defeated the Turks, but also easily captured the capital city of Chang'an after his rebellion. However, Li Yuanba is not known for his intelligence and can be quite foolish. His teacher had instructed him never to kill anyone who wielded a Golden-Tang (a spade-like weapon) in battle. Despite this, in two separate battles, Li Yuanba kills Wu Tianxi and Yuwen Chengdu, both of whom used Golden-Tangs. After killing Yuwen Chengdu, Li Yuanba is caught in a thunderstorm. Annoyed by the lightning and thunder, he throws his heavy hammers into the sky to strike the clouds. When the hammers fall back to the ground, one of them strikes and kills him.

==== Archetype ====
There are two inspirations for the character of Li Yuanba. The first is Li Xuanba (李玄霸), the historical third son of Li Yuan, who died young. Li Yuanba's name and social identity are derived from Li Xuanba. The second is Li Daoxuan (李道玄), a renowned general of the early Tang dynasty. Li Yuanba in the novel shares many similarities with Li Daoxuan in history: both are skilled martial artists, great generals, and royal-family members who died young.

=== Yuwen Chengdu ===
==== In the novel ====
In the novel, Yuwen Chengdu (宇文成都) is the elder son of Yuwen Huaji, a politically powerful figure in the Sui dynasty. Before Li Yuanba gained prominence, Yuwen Chengdu was considered the strongest warrior. His weapon is a Golden-Tang, weighing 200 kg. He is so formidable that most opponents flee at the mere mention of his name. In the Battle of Siming Mountain, Yuwen Chengdu single-handedly fights against Wu Yunshao, Wu Tianxi, and Xiong Kuohai for an entire day, ultimately defeating them. Though generally regarded as a hero, he is negatively influenced by his family, especially his father, Yuwen Huaji, who kills Yang Guang, the emperor of the Sui dynasty, in a military rebellion. Yuwen Chengdu is eventually killed by Li Yuanba during the Battle of Lintong Pass following the rebellion.

==== Archetype ====
Yuwen Chengdu is based on Yuwen Chengji (宇文承基), the historical son of Yuwen Huaji. Yuwen Chengji is notable primarily because of his father. After the military rebellion, Yuwen Chengji was killed by Dou Jiande, along with his father, Yuwen Huaji, his uncle, Yuwen Zhiji, and his younger brother, Yuwen Chengzhi (宇文承趾), who was the inspiration for Yuwen Chenglong (宇文成龙) in the novel. The only surviving member of his family, Yuwen Shiji (宇文士及), eventually became a high-ranking officer in the Tang dynasty.

=== Pei Yuanqing ===
==== In the novel ====
Pei Yuanqing (裴元庆) is considered the third strongest warrior of the period. Before Li Yuanba gained widespread recognition, Pei Yuanqing was the only warrior who could challenge Yuwen Chengdu. He is the third son of Pei Renji (裴仁基), the general in charge of the troops stationed at Shanma Pass. Like Li Yuanba, Pei Yuanqing gained fame at a young age and is renowned for his physical strength. His weapons are a pair of silver hammers, each weighing 150 kg. He and his father and brothers are ordered to attack the rebel army at Wagang Fort (瓦岗). Pei Yuanqing easily defeats dozens of Wagang warriors, including some notable figures on this list, such as Qin Shubao and Shan Xiongxin (see below). However, he and his family are later framed by another general and, with no other options, surrender to Wagang Fort. Pei Yuanqing is killed by a fire attack during the Battle of Linyang Pass.

==== Archetype ====
Pei Yuanqing is based on the historical figure Pei Xingyan (裴行俨), who, like Pei Yuanqing in the novel, was a young general in the Sui dynasty. The real history of Pei Xingyan and his father, Pei Renji, closely mirrors the story in Shuo Tang. Both father and son were renowned generals. They were ordered to attack Wagang Fort but failed and subsequently surrendered to the rebel army. Later, Pei Xingyan became one of the four major cavalry officers at Wagang Fort. After the rebellion at Wagang Fort ended in internal conflict, Pei, along with Cheng Yaojin and Qin Shubao, joined another rebel army led by the warlord Wang Shichong. However, they soon realized that Wang Shichong was an ineffective leader. Cheng and Qin defected to Li Yuan's army, but Pei and his father were unable to escape and were later sentenced to death by Wang Shichong.

=== Xiong Kuohai and the Wu Brothers ===
Xiong Kuohai, Wu Yunshao and Wu Tianxi are three entirely fictional warriors in the novel of Shuo Tang. Xiong Kuohai and Wu Tianxi do not have any basis in real history. Wu Yunshao's historical basis is disputed.

==== Xiong Kuohai ====
Xiong Kuohai (雄阔海) is a famous brigand in the Taihang Mountain area. His story has two main renditions. One version says that he uses a pair of axes, while another version says that his weapon is a heavy iron stick. Although he is a brigand with smuggling routes in the mountains, he helps poor and homeless people near the camp of his brigand troop. He meets the general Wu Yunshao in Taihang Mountain and is persuaded to join the government army to fight for the country. However, several months after that, Wu Yunshao rebels for his family (see below). As a result, Xiong Kuohai loses his path to join the official military. Later, in Xiangzhou (相州), the cruel general Ma Shumou begins kidnapping and devouring children. The governor of Xiangzhou, Gao Tansheng (高谈圣 in the book, or 高檀晟 in real history), despises this heartless behavior. Gao Tansheng finds Ma Shumou and argues with him, but Ma sends Gao to jail.

Learning of this, Xiong Kuohai leads his brigand troop to Xiangzhou and kills Ma Shumou. Then, he persuades Gao Tansheng to rebel. After that, more rebellions against the cruel emperor, corruption of local governments, and the endless war against Goguryeo Koreans and Turks spring up all over the country. When Emperor Yang Guang is travelling to Jiangdu, 18 major rebellion forces gather on Siming Mountain to ambush him. There, Xiong Kuohai, along with Wu Yunshao and Wu Tianxi, fight against Yuwen Chengdu for a whole day. With the help of Pei Yuanqing, they nearly defeat the emperor's military. However, Li Yuanba helps the emperor and saves his life (this is before Li's family's rebellion).

Years later, the central government wants to put down all the rebellions at once. Emperor Yang Guang asks Yang Lin to hold a martial arts contest in Yangzhou to attract warriors to that city. Their plan is that during the test, the warriors would fight and potentially kill each other. Then Yang Lin would close the city gates to trap the surviving warriors. After that, the emperor's forces would use bombs and fire to kill the survivors. The first half of the plan works: many warriors, including Wu Yunshao, are killed in the battle. However, Xiong Kuohai is late for the contest. When he arrives at the gate of Yangzhou, the heavy portcullis is just beginning to drop. He suddenly realizes that he has to stop the closing gate or the remaining warriors will die. He runs under the heavy portcullis and holds it aloft until the surviving warriors escape from Yangzhou. Then, he collapses and dies beneath the gate.

==== Wu Yunshao ====
In the book, Wu Yunshao (伍云召) is the son of a notable official Wu Jianzhang (伍建章), whose ancestor was said to be Wu Zixu. He uses a long spear as his weapon, and could also wield swords. After learning that former Emperor Yang Jian was actually killed by current Emperor Yang Guang, Wu Jianzhang derides the current emperor for his cruel, illegal and immoral actions. Yang Guang is annoyed and sentences Wu Jianzhang and his family to death. Fortunately, Wu Yunshao is staying with his troop in Nanyang Pass, but his family in the capital are killed. Wu Yunshao rebels without hesitating to avenge his family and overthrow the emperor. Emperor Yang Guang orders Han Qinhu, Yuwen Chengdu, Xin Wenli (See Below) and Shang Shitu (See Below), all great warriors, to attack Nanyang Pass. Wu Yunshao's troop defeats Han Qinhu, Xin Wenli and Shang Shitu, but cannot challenge Yuwen Chengdu. Wu sends his assistant, Jiao Fang, to ask for help from his cousin, Wu Tianxi.

Before Wu Tianxi reaches Nanyang Pass, Yuwen Chengdu breaks through the defenses, forcing Wu Yunshao to flee to Li Zitong, a local warlord in Shouzhou (寿州). Later, with Wu Yunshao's help, Li Zitong becomes one of the major forces fighting against the Sui dynasty. During the martial arts contest in Yangzhou, a foreign warrior called Zuo Xiong kills Wu Yunshao with a mechanism hidden in Zuo's horse's tail. Some people argue that Wu Yunshao might have a historical source in Yang Xuangan, who had a notable social status but rebelled after his father, Yang Su's, death. However, Yang Xuangan was killed as soon as his rebellion failed.

==== Wu Tianxi ====
Wu Tianxi (伍天锡) is the cousin of Wu Yunshao. His weapon is similar to Yuwen Chengdu's Golden-Tang, but slightly less heavy. Unlike Wu Yunshao's notable social status, Wu Tianxi is a brigand in Tuoluo Village. When Wu Yunshao is attacked by Yuwen Chengdu, his assistant, Jiao Fang, asks Tuoluo for help. Wu Tianxi then leads his troop to Nanyang Pass. However, when they traverse Taihang Mountain, they are stopped by Xiong Kuohai. Neither of them know the other's relationship to Wu Yunshao. They fight on Taihang Mountain for several days, until they both see Wu Yunshao as he flees. Wu Tianxi and Xiong Kuohai become acquainted, and after Wu Yunshao starts to fight for Li Zitong, Wu Tianxi also joins them. On Siming Mountain, the Wu brothers and Xiong Kuohai defeat Yuwen Chengdu with help from Pei Yuanqing. However, they are easily defeated by Li Yuanba the next day. When Wu Tianxi is travelling to Yangzhou for the martial arts contest, he meets Liang Shitai (see below), who is the assistant officer in Li Yuanba's troop. Liang and Wu had some conflicts, so they start to fight. Liang is killed, which infuriates Li Yuanba. Learning that Liang was working for Li Yuanba, Wu Tianxi is shocked. He tries to apologize to Li Yuanba, but it is too late. Li Yuanba quickly catches up to Wu Tianxi at the Tianchang Pass. During the ensuing battle, Li Yuanba is victorious, killing Wu Tianxi.

=== Luo Cheng ===
==== In the novel ====
In the novel, Luo Cheng (罗成) is the son of Luo Yi, a famous general guarding the northeastern frontier town of Jizhou, near modern-day Beijing. Luo's family has a unique spear technique that outsiders are not allowed to learn. Luo Cheng is well educated, not only in martial arts, but also in traditional Chinese philosophy, literature, and military tactics. Most importantly, Luo Cheng is quite handsome.

In the book of Shuo Tang, Luo Yi remains loyal to the Sui dynasty, but Luo Cheng takes part in the Wagang Fort rebellion. When that fails, Luo Cheng joins Wang Shichong's forces. Years later, he is persuaded by his old friends to join Li Shimin's troop to support Li Yuan's Tang dynasty. He defeats five warlords (Wang Shichong, Meng Haigong, Gao Tansheng, Zhu Can, and Dou Jiande) within one day. Two years later, another group led by Liu Heita (刘黑闼), Xu Yuanlang (徐圆朗), Shen Faxing, Gao Kaidao, and Tang Bi invades the Tang territories. Luo Cheng takes part and he is shot with arrows by a general in Liu Heita's troop, Su Dingfang. The cause of that conflict was the envy of Li Jiancheng and Li Yuanji towards Li Shimin. Luo Cheng is ultimately a victim of political conflicts between Li Yuan's sons.

There are more folktales about Luo Cheng outside of Shuo Tang, including his romances with Dou Jiande's daughter Xianniang (窦线娘) and with Hua Mulan. His son, Luo Tong (罗通), is a main character in the sequel of Shuo Tang. The legends also say that his descendant, Luo Yanqing (罗延庆), was a general in Yue Fei's troop in the Song dynasty.

Luo Cheng's cousin is Qin Shubao. As mentioned before, Luo's family knows special spear tactics. Similarly, Qin's family have special skills in using a jian (锏, a type of prism-shaped short-sword). One day, the cousins decide to secretly teach each other their special skills. Luo says he will teach all he knows to Qin; otherwise, he would die under arrows. Qin tells Luo that he will also teach all he knows, or he would be killed by a heavy object. Ironically, Luo Cheng kept secret his ultimate spear tactic, the Huimaqiang (回马枪: Make a fake retreat, and then suddenly stab the enemy when the enemy approaches from behind). At the same time, Qin Shubao also kept secret his best Jian tactic, the Shashoujian (杀手锏: Make a fake retreat. When the enemy attacks from behind, Qin would reach the Jian in his right hand backwards to ward off the enemy's weapon, and then suddenly turn around and beat the enemy with another Jian in his left hand). Luo Cheng is finally killed by arrows in battle. Qin would also die after trying to lift a heavy stone lion statue at a very old age.

==== Archetype ====
In historical records, Luo Yi really did have a son called Luo Cheng. However, other than his name, nothing more about Luo Cheng was recorded. The novel also glorified Luo Yi, depicting him as loyal. In reality, Luo Yi switched his position between the Sui and Tang Dynasties and among many warlords several times. Also, to glorify Luo Yi and Luo Cheng, this novel defamed Su Dingfang, who was a loyal military strategist in history, but a traitor in the novel. Luo Cheng's stories in the novel were mostly based on stories of Luo Shixin. Luo Shixin was a young general in the late Sui and early Tang dynasty. He started his career as a cavalry guard, then fought at Wagang Fort. He joined the Tang dynasty's force and helped Li Yuan and Li Shimin to unify the country. He was also killed during a battle against Liu Heita, like Luo Cheng in the novel. In some versions of the novel, there is also a character called Luo Shixin. However, that character is unrelated to the real Luo Shixin.

=== Yang Lin ===
==== In the novel ====
Yang Lin (杨林) belongs to the royal family of the Sui dynasty. He is the cousin of Yang Jian, the Sui founder. His weapon is a long stick called Qiulongbang (literally, "the stick to seal dragons"). Before the Sui dynasty, Yang Lin is a general in the Northern Zhou dynasty, a major kingdom ruled by the Yuwen family during the Southern and Northern dynasties era. He takes part in the Northern Zhou dynasty annexation of the Northern Qi dynasty. Yang Lin wins many battles, including the battle of Jizhou (济州) during which he kills the Northern Qi's general Qin Yi (秦彝), the father of Qin Shubao (see below). After his cousin, Yang Jian, usurps the Yuwen family and founds the Sui dynasty, Yang Lin receives a noble title. He remains loyal to the Sui dynasty to the end of his life.

Yang Lin has several adopted sons, all well-skilled in the military or martial arts. When he first meets Qin Shubao, Yan Lin is impressed by Qin's tactics. As a result, Yang Lin asks Qin to be his 13th adopted son. Qin thinks it a great opportunity to avenge his father, Qin Yi, so he becomes Yang Lin's 13th taibao (太保, adopted son). However, he never has a chance for revenge since Yang Lin is much stronger than him. Later, Qin escapes from Yang Lin's home and joins the rebellion at Wagang Fort. Yang Lin is very angry that one of his adopted sons betrayed him. He asks his troop to attack Wagang Fort, but just before Wagang Fort's collapse, Wagang Fort's officer Xu Shiji (or Xu Maogong 徐茂公) subverts Yang Lin's assistant general Tang Bi (唐壁 in the book, or 唐弼 in history). One of Yang Lin's former assistants, Cao Yanping (曹延平, see below), who was unfairly fired by Yang Lin, comes to reinforce Wagang Fort. Qin Shubao's cousin, Luo Cheng, also comes to help. In the next battle, half of Yang Lin's adopted sons, including Lu Fang (卢芳), Xue Liang (薛亮) and Yang Daoyuan (杨道源), are killed by warriors in Wagang Fort. To make things worse, a rebellion led by Liu Liuwang (刘留王) attacks Yang Lin's base camp in Dengzhou (登州). Yang Lin has no choice but to retreat.

After the country falls into chaos, Yang Lin begins to put down small rebellion groups. However, in the battle of Siming Mountain (see above), Yang Lin is defeated and nearly killed by Pei Yuanqing, who just suffered a loss in the battle against Li Yuanba. Yang Lin is the one who devises Yangzhou's martial arts contest. However, after the plan fails, Yang Lin and one of his adopted sons, Yin Yue (殷岳), are ambushed by Qin Shubao and Luo Cheng. Yin Yue is killed by Qin Shubao during the battle, and Yang Lin is hurt by Luo Cheng. It is a perfect opportunity for Qin Shubao to avenge his father, but Qin decides to forgive Yang Lin, for Qin is also Yang Lin's adopted son and pupil. Also, unlike many other local governors or generals at that time, Yang Lin never harmed the common people and tried to protect them. Qin Shubao respects Yang Lin despite everything.

At that point, the dejected Yang Lin says that he never regretted adopting Qin Shubao to be his adopted son. He says that he had always respected Qin Yi for the loyalty he showed, but he had to kill Qin Yi because they were enemies. He also tells Qin Shubao that the Sui dynasty might not survive, but the future of the common people would rely on heroes like Qin Shubao and Luo Cheng. Afterward, Yang Lin commits suicide by cutting his throat.

==== Archetypes ====
Yang Lin has three possible inspirations. All three are similar to Yang Lin, but none of them perfectly reflect the character. Yang Lin's identity and social status were similar to Yang Xiong (杨雄), a famous general in the Sui dynasty's royal family. Yang Xiong was similar to Yang Lin because they were both close relatives to the Sui emperors and both military elites. However, Yang Xiong died much earlier (612 A.D.) than Yang Lin's death in the novel (likely 618 A.D.). Yang Lin's stories were most likely based on Lai Hu'er and Zhang Xutuo. Lai Hu'er was a famous Sui general known for putting down rebellions in the Huai River basin and the lower valley of the Yangtze River. He was also the first to support the real Qin Shubao's talent. Like Yang Lin, Lai Hu'er remained loyal to the Sui dynasty until his death. He was killed by Yuwen Huaji during a military coup. Although Lai Hu'er never appeared in the Shuo Tang, he was included in the most accepted ranking list of the 18 warriors.

Zhang Xutuo was another famous military strategist in the Sui dynasty, known for fighting rebels in the Yellow River basin, including Lu Mingyue (卢明月) and Sun Xuanya (孙宣雅). Zhang Xutuo was first to give the real Qin Shubao the opportunity to foster his skills. Qin Shubao and Luo Shixin became famous when they were assistant generals in Zhang Xutuo's troop. Although Zhang Xutuo was a considerable threat to Wagang Fort, Wagang Fort's forces finally killed Zhang Xutuo during the battle of Xingyang.

=== Wei Wentong ===
==== In the novel ====
Wei Wentong (魏文通) is a major military officer whose base camp is in Tongguan Pass, one of the most important forts in central China. He looks very similar to the famous Guan Yu from the Three Kingdoms era, and his weapon is the same as Guan Yu's: a large blade called Qinglong-Yanyue-Dao (青龙偃月刀, "the Blade of Green Dragon and Crescent Moon"). He takes part in several remarkable battles, including Wagang Fort. He is killed by an arrow from Wang Bodang, a famous archer in the Wagang Fort army.

==== Archetypes ====
Wei Wentong's name comes from Wei Wentong (尉文通, same pronunciation but different characters), a leader of a small rebellion group in Yanmen Pass in the late Sui dynasty. However, his role in the plot was more likely derived from stories of Wei Wensheng (卫文升) or Wei Xuan (卫玄). Wei Wensheng was a brave warrior in the Sui dynasty who got famous during a battle against Goryeo Koreans. After that battle, he became a general and was ordered to guard the Tongguan Pass. He died of an illness before the collapse of the Sui dynasty.

=== Shang Shitu and Xin Wenli ===
Shang Shitu (尚师徒) and Xin Wenli (新文理) are both entirely fictional characters.

==== Shang Shitu ====
Shang Shitu is the general guarding Linyang Pass. He is called the "General with Four Treasures," because he has four unique artifacts: the Tilu Spear, the Horse of Hulei-Bao, the Yeming Helmet, and the Fish Scale Armour. The Tilu Spear is a long spear with a fillister near the spearpoint. When enemies are hit by the Tilu Spear, their blood gushes out with supernatural speed. The neighing of the Hulei-Bao frightens an enemy's horses during battle. The Yeming Helmet is made with luminous material, aiding Shang Shitu during battles at night. The Fish Scale Armour is so dense that normal swords and spears cannot cut through it. Shang Shitu takes part in several large battles. When Wagang Fort's forces expand to Linyang Pass, Shang Shitu and Xin Wenli's forces hold a united defense. Ambivalently, Shang Shitu is aware that Wagang Fort was good for the common people, but he can never join the rebellion because he swore that he would never betray his country. At last, he commits suicide, because by doing so he would neither betray the Sui dynasty nor get in the way of the rebellion. Before his death, he gifts the Tilu Spear and the Hulei-Bao to Qin Shubao.

==== Xin Wenli ====
Xin Wenli is the general guarding the Hongni Pass. His weapon is an iron shuo (槊, a spear-like weapon with a big spearpoint). He is called the General of Eight Horses, not because he has eight horses for riding, but because his physical strength would be enough to stop a carriage towed by eight horses. His stories are similar to Shang Shitu's because they usually fight together. Xin Wenli's troop slays the famous warrior Pei Yuanqing. Xin Wenli dies while facing Wagang warriors, including Qin Shubao, Cheng Yaojin, Wang Bodang, and Shan Xiongxin. His sister, Xin Yue'e (新月娥), is also a well-known female warrior.

=== Cao Yanping ===
Cao Yanping (曹延平) is also called Ding Yanping (定延平) in different versions. He only has a small role in some versions of the book, and he did not have a model in real history. In both versions, his weapons are a pair of short spears.

==== Version 1 ====
Cao Yanping was an assistant officer in Yang Lin's camp when both he and Yang Lin were young. One day, during a tactical drill, his side defeated Yang Lin's side without mercy. Yang Lin was annoyed and he dismissed Cao Yanping. Decades later, when Yang Lin's force attack Wagang Fort, Cao Yanping reinforces Wagang Fort and fights against Yang Lin. This time he loses to Yang Lin and is killed during the battle. However, his reinforcement is essential for Wagang Fort to survive. He is also the teacher of another great warrior, Zhang Shanxiang (张善相).

==== Version 2 ====
Ding Yanping is a friend of Luo Yi's, and he was also the teacher of Luo Cheng when Luo Cheng was very young. When Yang Lin attacks Wagang Fort, he invites Deng Yanping to help him. When he is on his way to Yang Lin's camp, Deng Yanping comes across Luo Cheng. He had not seen Luo Cheng for several years, so he does not know Luo Cheng is already allied to Wagang Fort. Knowing Ding Yanping is to fight for Yang Lin, Luo Cheng gains the military plans from Ding Yanping by cheating. Ding Yanping and Yang Lin do not realize the truth until they lose several battles. At last, Ding Yanping realizes that his student is his opponent. He is extremely sad and leaves the camp alone one evening. He neither goes to Wagang Fort nor returns to Yang Lin's camp. No one knows where he went, and he has never been seen since.

=== Lai Hu'er ===
As mentioned above, Lai Hu'er (来护儿) was a historical figure who has a small role Shuo Tang and appears in this list. He was a navy general and got famous by fighting against Goguryeo Koreans. He also put down several rebel generals in eastern China. Lai Hu'er was loyal to the Sui dynasty until his death, even though one of his sons, Lai Yuan (来渊), joined the rebellion led by Yang Xuangan. Lai Hu'er was killed by Yuwen Huaji's army while trying to protect Emperor Yang Guang in Jiangdu during the mutiny.

=== Liang Shitai ===
==== In the novel ====
Like Cao Yanping, Liang Shitai (梁师泰) has a small supporting role in the book. He is the master of a manor called Guachui-Zhuang (挂锤庄, literally: "the manor with a pair of hammers hanging at the gate"). He uses a pair of copper hammers as his weapon. When other warriors come to his manor, he asks permission to fight them. If he is defeated by the guest, or the guest holds their own for a long time, he invites the guest into his manor and makes friends with them.

One day, the Wagang Fort warrior Shan Xiongxin (单雄信, See below) comes to the manor after losing a battle. The tired and hungry Shan Xiongxin is easily defeated by Liang Shitai, so he is not invited in. When Shan Xiongxin is on his way back to Wagang Fort, he comes across Li Yuanba. Since Shan Xiongxin and Li Yuanba's first assistant officer Chai Shao were old time friends, he asked Li Yuanba for help defeating Liang Shitai. Li Yuanba returns with him to the manor and together, they beat Liang Shitai. However, Li Yuanba notices Liang Shitai's talents during the fight, so he invites Liang Shitai to be his trailbreaking officer in the army. Liang Shitai starts to work for Li's family. He is later killed by Wu Tianxi near Tianchang Pass (see above).

==== Archetype ====
Liang Shitai's historical basis might be Liang Shidu, a leader of a rebellion group, and later a warlord, in Shuofang. Liang Shidu rebelled in the Sui dynasty, and then obtained Turkic support, and became a powerful warlord in the early Tang dynasty. He was defeated by a troop led by Chai Shao and annexed by Tang's force in the year 628. However, some people disagree because they think Liang Shidu was the origin of another small character in the novel, Liang Shitu (梁师徒).

=== Zuo Tiancheng ===
Zuo Tiancheng (左天成) is a fictional general guarding the Sishui Pass. He is hardly mentioned in the book Shuo Tang, but he is very popular in folktales. He uses a golden blade as his weapon and he is regarded as a top warrior in the Sui dynasty. He became famous at a young age, when he bravely ambushed a strong troop from a major Turkic tribe in the northern frontier. He used to fight alone against the Wangang Five Tigers (the five best warriors in Wagang Fort, i.e. Qin Shubao 秦叔宝, Qiu Rui 邱瑞, Cheng Yaojin 程咬金, Wang Bodang 王伯当 and Shan Xiongxin 单雄信). The first time he loses a battle is when he is defeated by Pei Yuanqing. He is loyal to the Sui dynasty and is eventually killed by Xiong Kuohai during another battle.

=== Qin Shubao ===
==== In the novel ====
Qin Shubao, or Qin Qiong 秦琼) is a very important character in the novel. As mentioned above, he is the son of Qin Yi (秦彝, see Yang Lin's section) and used a pair of Jian (see Luo Cheng's section) as his weapons. Although he lost his father, he was well educated by his mother, Madam Ning. He is not only known for his great military and martial arts skills, but also for his reputation as a low-ranking government officer. He is kind to common people but strict with his own men.

Many folktales about him have inspirations from the Shuo Tang, including selling his horse, fighting against Yang Lin and Wei Wentong, saving Li Yuan's family in Lintong Pass, and serving as a door god along with Yuchi Gong (see below), etc. He starts as a low-ranking officer in Jinan, and then serves under Luo Yi, Tang Bi and Yang Lin before taking part in the Wagang Fort rebellion. After the collapse of Wagang Fort, he briefly serves Wang Shichong and then joins the troop led by Li Shimin. He plays a significant role in unifying the country. After Li Shimin becomes the second emperor of the Tang dynasty, Qin Shubao leads a troop and defeats the Turkic army in the north. When Goryeo Koreans invade the northeastern frontier, both Qin Shubao and Yuchi Gong want to fight back. They agree that the one who can carry a stone lion sculpture longer will get to be the general. Yuchi Gong raises the lion but only for a little while. Qin Shubao could not only raise the lion but also walk back and forth across the yard three times. However, Qin Shubao suddenly collapses afterward. Later, Yuchi Gong becomes general because Qin Shubao's situation is so bad. Qin Shubao dies several weeks after Yuchi Gong leaves for Goguryeo Korea (see Luo Cheng's section). His son, Qin Huaiyu (秦怀玉), becomes a great warrior of the next generation.

==== Archetype ====
Refer to Qin Shubao for details. Qin Shubao was a real person, and the novel contains many true facts about his early life. However, some stories, especially after Li Shimin became the emperor, were fictional. In real life, Qin Shubao retired due to poor health after Li Shimin became emperor. It was Li Jing and Xu Shiji, not Qin Shubao, who defeated the Turkic army.

=== Yuchi Gong ===
==== In the novel ====
Yuchi Gong (or Yuchi Jingde, 尉迟敬德) is a major character in the latter half of the Shuo Tang, as well as in the sequel. He has dark skin, and uses a Bian (a columnar- and pagoda-shaped traditional Chinese weapon). His teacher told him that he could not survive without his Bian. He starts as a blacksmith living in Taiyuan. After Li Yuan claims Taiyuan's independence from the Sui dynasty, two of Li Yuan's sons, Li Jiancheng and Li Yuanji, are ordered to recruit soldiers. Due to their poor reputation, they cannot find any volunteers. Then, Li Yuanji advises Li Jiancheng to recruit under Li Shimin's name, since his reputation was much better than theirs. Believing that Li Shimin is recruiting in Taiyuan, Yuchi Gong goes there and becomes a soldier. However, he was unfairly treated by Li Yuanji's men. Angrily, he leaves the camp, thinking it was Li Shimin who had treated him poorly. Later, he joins another warlord, Liu Wuzhou, near Taiyuan.

The major military officer under Liu Wuzhou, Song Jingang, notices Yuchi Gong's talent. Song asks Yuchi Gong to be his assistant officer. When Liu Wuzhou and Li Yuan declare war on each other, Yuchi Gong fights hard to avenge the indignity he suffered in Li's camp. He leads his men to occupy Li Yuan's three cities during one day, and eight villages during the following night. Li Yuanji and Li Jiancheng are defeated. Li Yuanba is already dead at that time, so Li Yuan sends Li Shimin to stop Yuchi Gong. One evening, when Li Shimin and Cheng Yaojin (or Cheng Zhijie 程知节, another warrior known for his three axe-fighting tactics) are marching, they are ambushed by Yuchi Gong at a creek called Meiliang-Chuan (美良川). Although Li Shimin and Cheng Yaojin are both great warriors, they are defeated. Li Shimin asks Cheng Yaojin to retreat and find Qin Shubao for help. Cheng Yaojin worries that Yuchi Gong might kill Li Shimin before he returns. Yuchi Gong promises that he would not dare try to kill Li Shimin before Qin Shubao returns, or he will die under the Zhijin Gate, a major gate in Chang'an.

When Cheng Yaojin leaves, Li Shimin asks Yuchi Gong why he did not join Li's troop, as he is from Taiyuan. Yuchi Gong, still thinking it was Li Shimin who had been so rude to him, is irritated by this conversation. Li Shimin explains that he was not recruiting in Taiyuan, but it just makes Yuchi Gong angrier. Yuchi Gong cannot stop himself from attacking Li Shimin. Fortunately, Qin Shubao arrives just then. The battle is a tie, but Yuchi Gong uses three tactics with his Bian, while Qin Shubao only uses two tactics with his Jian. The battle of Meiliang-Chuan is called Three Bians versus Two Jians (三鞭换两锏) in folktales, and it is said that people usually regard Qin Shubao as a little better than Yuchi Gong in martial arts.

After that, Li Shimin beseeches Yuchi Gong to join his forces several times. Yuchi Gong, moved by Li Shimin, starts to believe that it was not Li Shimin who treated him unfairly. Eventually, after the death of Liu Wuzhou and Song Jingang, Yuchi Gong surrenders to Li Shimin and becomes a major general fighting for the Tang dynasty. In the battle of Luo Yang, when Li Shimin is attacked by Shan Xiongxin, it is Yuchi Gong who saves Li Shimin. When Li Shimin is framed by his brothers (Li Jiancheng and Li Yuanji), Yuchi Gong proves Li Shimin's innocence. Without Yuchi Gong, Li Shimin would not have become the emperor.

When Yuchi Gong is fighting against Goryeo Koreans years later (see Qin Shubao's section), he notices the talent of a young warrior called Xue Rengui (薛仁贵, or Xue Li 薛礼). He appoints Xue Rengui as his adopted son because he believes Xue Rengui will serve the Tang Dynasty's military well. However, Xue Rengui is envied by Zhang Shigui (张士贵) and Li Daozong, who frame him as a criminal. Xue Rengui is sent to jail after being set up by Zhang and Li. To save Xue Rengui, Yuchi Gong argues with Li Daozong, and then Emperor Li Shimin, who believes Li Daozong over Xue Rengui. After the judge announces that Xue Rengui will be sent to death row, Yuchi Gong is so disappointed that he hits the Zhijin Gate with his Bian. His Bian shatters into several pieces, and he suddenly remembers his teacher's words, as well as what he had said to Li Shimin at Meiliang-Chuan. He realizes his time hs come, so he commits suicide in front of the Zhijin Gate.

Li Shimin is distraught after learning of Yuchi Gong's death, so he puts off Xue Rengui's execution and agree to re-try the case. Later, Xue Rengui is proved to be innocent. Xue Rengui becomes an excellent general in the Tang dynasty after several years. He defeats the Turks, Tuyuhun, Tibetan Empire, Uighur Kingdoms, some city states and tribes along the Silk Road, and Korean kingdoms in the following years. Yuchi Gong's three sons, Yuchi Baolin (尉迟宝林, historical figure), Yuchi Baoqing (尉迟宝庆, fictional) and Yuchi Haohuai (尉迟号怀, fictional), are all great warriors in the next generation.

==== Archetype ====
Refer to Yuchi Gong for details. Yuchi Gong was the person in Shuo Tang whose stories were closest to the real history. Although there was no "Three Bians versus Two Jians" in real life (Qin Shubao and Yuchi Gong both used spears), the battle of Meiliang-Chuan was real. The battle of Luo Yang and the conflict between the Li Brothers were also true stories. Yuchi Gong also had conflicts with Li Daozong in his later years, recorded in other historical books. However, the reason he fought with Li Daozong was not because of Xue Rengui. In reality, both Zhang Shigui and Li Daozong were loyal generals who contributed a lot to the Tang dynasty. Their contributions were no less than Yuchi Gong's and Xue Rengui's. Xue Rengui's talent was actually discovered by Zhang Shigui. Yuchi Gong also never committed suicide. When he was elderly, he retired from the government and became a devout Taoist priest. He lived a peaceful lifestyle for 16 more years before his death.

=== Shan Xiongxin ===
==== In the novel ====
Shan Xiongxin (or Shan Tong, 单通) is a major character in Shuo Tang. He is the master at the Erxian Manor and also the leader of Greenwoods (绿林好汉, warriors and heroes that do not work for the government). His weapon is a Shuo (see Xin Wenli's section). He is respected by many because he is kind to poor people and heroes in need. He is Qin Shubao's best friend. He is also one of the leaders of the Wagang Fort rebellion. After Wagang Fort's collapse, he serves the warlord Wang Shichong. When his old friends, including Qin Shubao, Cheng Yaojin (程咬金), and Xu Shiji (or Xu Maogong 徐茂公) were all leaving for Li Shimin, he stays with Wang Shichong, because Li Shimin's father Li Yuan mistakenly killed his brother Shan Xiongzhong (单雄忠, or Shan Dao 单道). Later, he marries Wang Shichong's daughter.

After the battle of Luoyang, the ally power that Wang Shichong, Meng Haigong, Gao Tansheng, Zhu Can and Dou Jiande fought under collapses. Wang Shichong surrenders to the Tang dynasty, but Shan Xiongxin chooses to die rather than switch sides. Before he is beheaded, Qin Shubao, Cheng Yaojin, and Xu Shiji come to see him in the jail. They drink a lot and cry a lot, vowing that they will be friends again in the afterlife. Then, before the execution, Xu Shiji cuts off a piece of flesh from his leg and asks Shan Xiongxin to eat, believing that with the flesh, they would be together in some way forever. After Shan Xiongxin eats the flesh, he is executed.

==== Archetype ====
Shan Xiongxin was a real person in the Sui dynasty, and most stories in the book were close to the historical truth. Some feel that the novel glorified Shan Xiongxin, ignoring certain personality flaws of his historical counterpart. However, the story that he ate Xu Shiji's flesh was real, and it impressed people for hundreds of years.
