= Wagang Army =

Wagang Army (Chinese: 瓦岗军, 611–618) was a key rebel army in the late Sui dynasty of China. The Wagang Army was primarily led by Zhai Rang before 617, and Li Mi after 617. To its greatest extent, it occupied major territories in the Henan and Shandong provinces. It was one of the three strongest peasant forces of its time, the other two being Dou Jiande's army in Hebei and Du Fuwei's army in the south. The Wagang Army played a significant role in overthrowing the Sui dynasty.

== History ==
In August 604, Emperor Yang of Sui took the throne after murdering his father and elder brother. Being known as a tyrant in Chinese history, Emperor Yang was a smart but conceited ruler. During his reign, he constructed the Grand Canal, rebuilt the Great Wall, launched three campaigns against the Goguryeo, declared war with the Turks and Tuyuhun, and introduced harsh laws and heavy taxes. As a result, the people of Sui dynasty could no longer endure this reign. Beginning in 611, massive uprisings and rebellions occurred all over the empire.

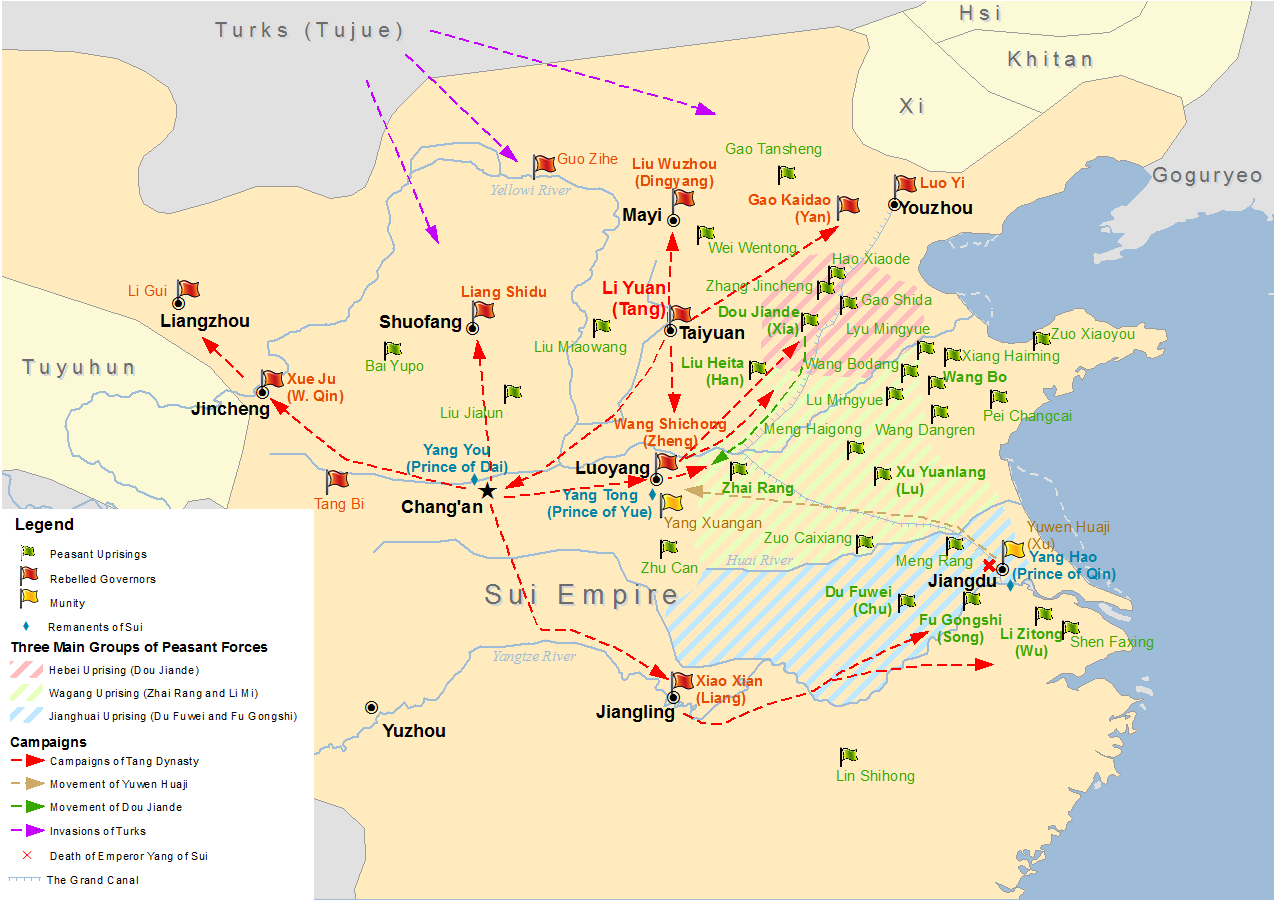
Map showing major uprisings and rebellions in the last years of Sui dynasty. The greatest extent of the land controlled by Wagang Army is shown as the light green shade.

The Wagang Uprising was one of those first uprisings that occurred in 611. It was led by Zhai Rang, a former low-ranked official in Dongjun county who had been sent to jail due to some crime but was then arbitrarily released by a prison guard named Huang Junhan. After being released, Zhai Rang went to Wagang, a small village and fort on a hill, and stayed there with a group of outlaws and refugees. With great personal charm, Zhai Rang became their leader. In 611, when Zhai Rang learned of the massive peasant uprisings breaking out in Shandong, he decided to follow the trend by establishing the Wagang Army.

Zhai was then followed and supported by many other smaller, local rebellious forces. These forces included those led by Wang Bodang, Bing Yuanzhen and Li Gongyi. Due to the great leadership shown by Zhai as well as Wagang's strategic location, many other warriors and strategists, such as Shan Xiongxin, Xu Shiji and Chai Xiaohe, also came to join the army. Wagang Army gradually became stronger and eventually became a threat to Luoyang, the second capital of Sui dynasty, as well as many granaries in Henan region.

In 616, an intelligent, well-known nobleman, Li Mi, who had served as an adviser in Yang Xuangan's rebel army, joined the Wagang Army after Yang Xuangan was defeated by an army sent by the Sui dynasty. Li Mi quickly became the second in command of Wagang after he led the army to victory during the Battle of Xingyang, and killed the famous Sui general Zhang Xutuo during battle. Not only did this battle give the Wagang Army fame and a reputation as the most powerful rebel army at that time, but the Wagang army also absorbed many other great warriors and generals, such as Qin Shubao and Luo Shixin. The army became extremely strong.

With the help of Li Mi, Wagang Army reached its peak. It occupied territory of central China and controlled many important forts, cities and granaries. Li Mi then became the de facto leader of the army. However, in 617, an internal conflict between Li Mi and Zhai Rang broke out, and the conflict ended up with Zhai Rang being killed by Li Mi. After that, Li Mi became the sole leader of the army.

The army soon started a series of wars against Wang Shichong, another warlord based in Luoyang. At the same time, Emperor Yang was murdered by Yuwen Huaji in Jiangdu. Yuwen Huaji led the palace guards and other former Sui forces marching towards Luoyang. Noticing Yuwen Huaji's approach, Li Mi and Wang Shichong negotiated and suspended their fighting, instead standing together and launching a war against Yuwen Huaji.

Yuwen Huaji's forces were defeated by Li Mi, but the battle seriously weakened Li Mi's Wagang Army. Afterwards, Wang Shichong attacked Wagang Army again, and Li Mi's forces was completely defeated. He and Wang Bodang fled westward and surrendered to the newly established Tang dynasty. The remnants of the Wagang Army were dissolved and its generals joined the other factions present, including the new Tang dynasty, Wang Shichong's forces, Du Fuwei's forces and Dou Jiande's forces.

== In folk culture ==
Many stories of the Sui and Tang heroes in folk cultures, such as 18 Warriors of Sui-Tang Period, were based on the Wagang Army. Wagang leaders and generals, such as Qin Shubao, Wang Bodang, Xu Shiji, Shan Xiongxin, Cheng Yaojin and Pei Xingyan are popular figures in folk tales and hero novels.
