= Wang Bodang =

General in Wagang Army

- 王伯当
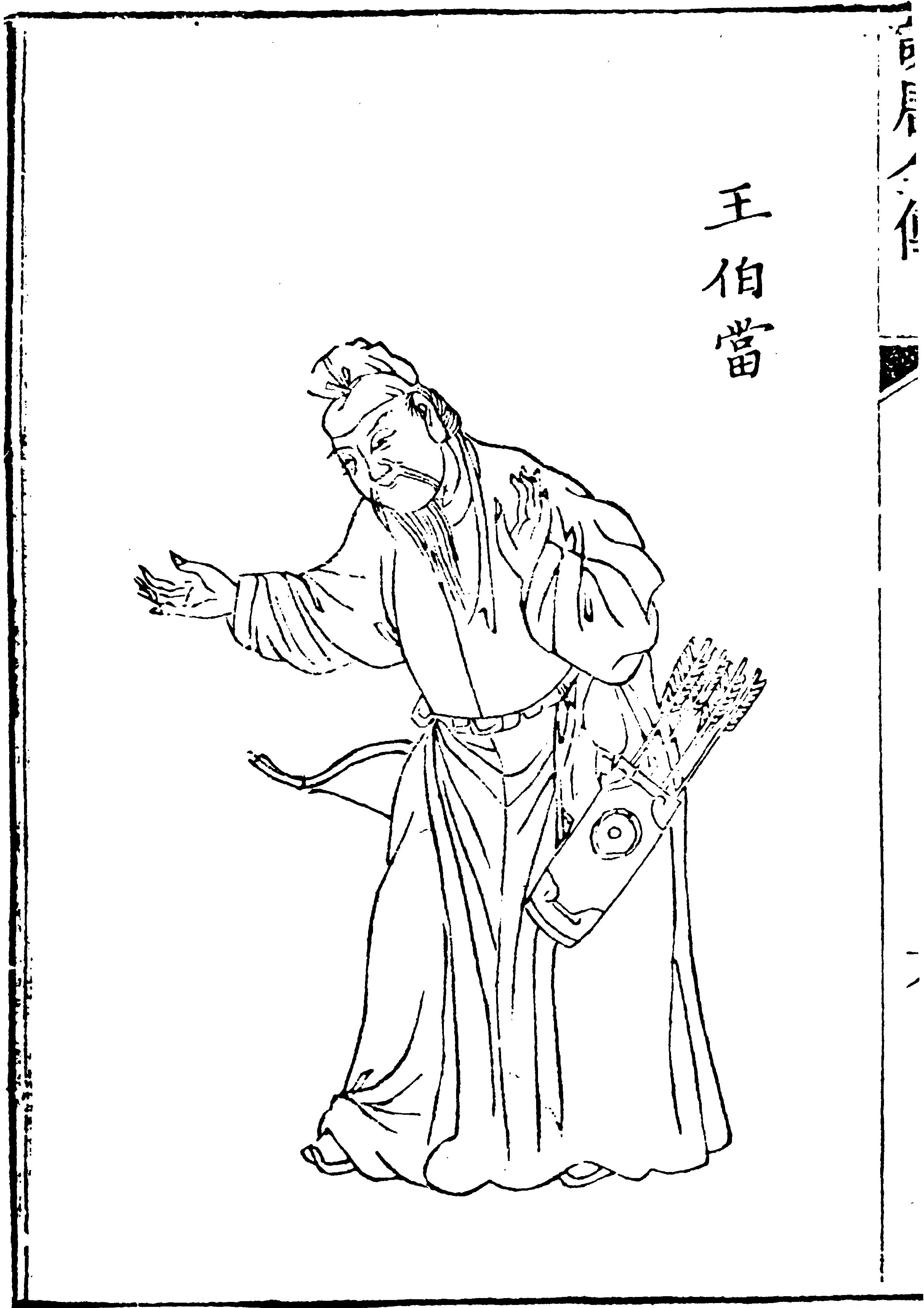

Personal details
- Born: unknown Hejin
- Died: 20 January 619; Xiong'er Mountain near Luoyang
- Occupation: Leader of peasant uprising in Sui dynasty

Wang Bodang was a general in Wagang Army which rebelled against the Sui dynasty. He is also a highly celebrated and praised figure in Chinese popular culture because of his bravery and loyalty.

== In history ==
Wang Bodang was born in Yitang, a village in Hejin of Shanxi. When the Sui dynasty began to dissolve during Emperor Yang's reign, Wang Bodang led a small-scaled peasant uprising in Jiyang (near the county of Lankao today). Later, Wang Bodang and his peasant force joined Wagang Army, one of the most powerful peasant rebellion armies at that time. Wang was promoted to be a top general in Wagang.

During the internal authority shift of Wagang Army in 617, Wang Bodang supported Li Mi and helped Li Mi to murder Zhai Rang, the previous leader of Wagang Army. Since then, Wang Bodang was one of the closest followers to Li Mi. In 618, when Li Mi was leading the main force of Wagang Army to attack warlord Wang Shichong, Wang Bodang was the general to guard the fort of Jinyong, the headquarter of Wagang Army.

Li Mi was defeated by Wang Shichong during the war and many other generals of Wagang Army, including Pei Xingyan, Luo Shixin, Cheng Yaojin, Shan Xiongxin and Qin Shubao, surrendered to Wang Shichong. Wang Bodang decided to stay with Li Mi. When Li Mi was trying to suicide, Wang stopped him. He suggested that Li Mi should go west and submit to the newly established Tang dynasty. Li Mi took his advice. Wang Bodang also promised that he would always be a follower to Li Mi no matter what happened.

In 619, Li Mi planned to break away from Tang dynasty and establish his own regime again. Wang Bodang thought that they had no chance to succeed, so he argued with Li Mi. However, Li Mi still determined to continue with his plan. On 20 January 619, when they were heading towards Xiangcheng to meet their previous ally Zhang Shanxiang, Li Mi and Wang Bodang were ambushed by Tang's army led by Sheng Yanshi (the general of Tang guarding Xiongzhou) at Xiong'er Mountain near Luoyang. Both Li Mi and Wang Bodang were killed.

== In popular culture ==
In folk tales about Wagang Army, Wang Bodang's stories are generally very close to the real history. However, in addition to real stories, he is also said to be one of the best archers at his time. In some versions of the legend, Wang Bodang likes wearing white clothes, and thus has a nickname of The Bowman in White. Ironically, in those legends, Wang Bodang was killed by arrows at Xiong'er Mountain, although there is no clear document indicating how exactly he was killed by Sheng Yanshi in real history.
