= Jinhua shortbread =

Raditional snack in China

Jinhua Shortbread, also known as Jinhua Crispy Cake and Jinhua Shortcake, is a traditional snack in Jinhua City, Zhejiang Province, China.

== Recipe ==
Jinhua shortbread is made with white flour, dried potherb mustard, fatty meat, sesame seeds, vegetable oil, caramel, and honey. The dough is rolled into a cake the size of a crab shell, then stuffed with dried vegetables and meat. It is then baked until golden on both sides. Afterwards, it is covered with sesame seeds. There are more than ten thin, transparent layers on the top and bottom.

== Culture ==
=== History ===
Jinhua shortbread was first seen in "Zhongzulu" written by Wu clan in Pujiang County, Zhejiang, Wuzhou, Southern Song dynasty. It is recorded that the shortbread was filled with honey, which is slightly different from today's fillings. Jinhua shortbread cookies were developed in the 1980s. After continuous improvement in technology, additional variations were successfully developed including ham shortbread, beef shortbread, sweet shortbread, spicy shortbread, double hemp shortbread, ginger wean shortbread, braised pork and red bean paste shortbread. Further changes include the transition from charcoal baking to far-infrared oven baking, and the original paper packaging was replaced by a non-toxic polyethylene bag. In recent years, Jinhua shortbread won recognition as Provincial Excellent Product. Jinhua shortbread shops can be seen everywhere in Jinhua. More than 40 large-scale shortbread manufacturers operate in Jinhua City, with a daily output of 60,000 pieces. Manufacturers have established production and sales relationships with more than 20 cities across the country.

=== Legend ===
Legend has it that the original creator of Jinhua shortbread was Cheng Yaojin, known as the "Hunshi Devil". Cheng Yaojin, one of the 24 founding fathers of the Tang dynasty, made a living selling biscuits in Jinhua in his early years. Once, he made too many sesame seed biscuits, and they did not sell out. He saved the pie and prepared to continue selling it the next day. However, if the biscuits went bad, they could not be sold. In order to prevent the biscuits from going bad, Cheng Yaojin placed all the biscuits on the side of the stove. He wanted to keep the fire going to prevent the biscuits from going bad. The next day he found that the oil in the biscuits had been roasted, and the crust became more oily and crispy, and it became a shortbread. When the customers saw that Cheng Yaojin's cake was very different from before, they all rushed to taste it. Cheng Yaojin was very happy, and shouted: "Come on! Sweet and crispy shortbread!" The popularity of this new snack prompted some biscuits shop owners even asked Cheng Yaojin for the "secret recipe." Cheng Yaojin laughed loudly and said, "I don't have any secret recipe!"

The shortbread cakes were as round as a teacup, shaped like crab shells, had a golden color and sesame seeds on both sides, and had the aroma of dried vegetable and meat fillings. Later, Cheng Yaojin participated in the peasant uprising at the end of the Sui dynasty, became the owner of the village in Wagangzhai, and then became a founding father of the Tang dynasty. After he became famous, he still could not forget his early career in selling cakes and highly recommended the snack. Jin Hua Su Bing has become widely known. Since him, the practice has passed down from generation to generation, and it eventually became a well-known traditional specialty.

It is rumored that after the Ming dynasty Zhu Yuanzhang conquered Jinhua, he and Liu Bowen tasted shortbread in Wuzhou Mingyuelou. During the Taiping Heavenly Kingdom, the Jinhua people used shortbread to comfort King Li who had repeatedly defeated the Qing army.

== Production ==
The traditional Jinhua shortbread are baked in a large wooden barrel. Nowadays, it is more common to use an oven.

Jinhua shortbread production is separated into five stages:

- Meat and filling preparation: The meat is diced. Dried plums are added to the meat and add some salt. The result must be stirred.
- Dough preparation: 225 grams of all-purpose flour, 90 grams of lard, 30 grams of icing sugar, and 63 grams of water are added into a watery oily dough. The kneaded dough is divided into 20 gram portions.
- Each portion is rolled into a beef tongue shape, brushed with corn oil and rolled up. The step is repeated. The dough is covered with a cloth and let stand for 20 minutes.
- Each portion is rolled flat again and the filling is added. The dough is folded like a dumpling.
- The portions are placed in a baking tray. Each portion gets two cuts in the middle, and is sprinkled with sesame seeds. The dish is baked at 180 degrees for 20 minutes, then at 220 degrees for 5 minutes to color the shortbread.

== Flavor analysis ==
Jinhua shortbread is characterized by crispy skin and a strange smell but not greasy flesh. It typically features a golden yellow color, clear layers, and oily but not greasy feel, and a crisp texture.
