= Pei Xingyan =

Chinese general during 6th century

- 裴行俨

Personal details
- Born: late 6th century Hedong
- Died: c.June 619 Luoyang
- Parent: Pei Renji (father)
- Occupation: General
- Title: Duke of Jiang County
- Clan: Pei clan of Hedong

Pei Xingyan was a general during the Sui dynasty who was known for his superior fighting skills on the battlefield. He was also a highly celebrated warrior in popular culture and traditional Chinese dramas.

== In history ==
Pei Xingyan was the son of Pei Renji, a general of the Sui dynasty during Emperor Yang's reign. He was born with great strength and acquired superb fighting skills when he was young. He served in the Sui army under general Zhang Xutuo and suppressed several peasant uprisings in the northern plains.

After Zhang Xutuo was defeated and killed in a battle against Wagang Army, Pei Xingyan and his father Renji surrendered to Wagang. The leader of Wagang Army, Li Mi, appointed Xingyan to be Shang-Zhuguo (Chinese: 上柱国; lit. 'superior pillar of the state') and gave him the title Duke of Jiang County (绛郡公). Along with Qin Shubao, Cheng Yaojin and Luo Shixin, Pei Xingyan became one of the four most trusted generals under Li Mi.

In 618, a war broke out between Li Mi's Wagang Army and the warlord Wang Shichong. During the war, Wang Shichong sent his men to attack Yanshi, which was guarded by Shan Xiongxin. Shan Xiongxin did not have many troops and could not hold the city. Li Mi thus sent Cheng Yaojin and Pei Xingyan to reinforce Shan Xiongxin. Outside of Yanshi, Cheng and Pei were attacked by Wang Shichong's men, and Pei was shot by an arrow and was almost killed. He was saved by Cheng Yaojin.

Soon after this, however, Li Mi was completely defeated by Wang Shichong and submitted to the Tang dynasty. Pei Xingyan and his father Renji were trapped near Luoyang and had to submit to Wang Shichong. In 619, Wang Shichong claimed to be the Emperor of Zheng. He appointed Pei Renji to be the chief minister of the Ministry of Rites under his reign, and Pei Xingyan to be Left Vice General-in-chief.

Pei Xingyan fought in several battles for Wang Shichong. He was so strong and brave that his enemies gave him the nickname of Wanrendi (Chinese: 万人敌; lit. 'the man who could fight alone against ten thousands'). However, Wang Shichong was a suspicious and jealous person. He thought that Pei Renji and Pei Xingyan would submit to Tang dynasty some day and would become his enemy. Therefore, Wang Shichong planned to assassinate the Pei family. Noticing the plan of Wang Shichong, Pei Renji, Pei Xingyan and their allies proposed a mutiny in order to escape from Luoyang and reinstall the Sui dynasty. Unfortunately, their plan was exposed before their action. Wang Shichong executed Pei Renji and Pei Xingyan in Luoyang. All their family members were wiped out except for Xingyan's younger brother Xingjian who was less than one year old at that time and somehow survived in this tragedy.

== In popular culture ==
Pei Xingyan is known as Pei Yuanqing in popular culture and is known as the third strongest warrior during the Sui dynasty. People believe that he is the reincarnation of Nezha. His weapons are a pair of silver hammers. He originally served in the Sui army. Due to the circumvention of his political opponents, he submitted to the Wagang Army with his father Pei Renji. During the battle at Hongni Pass, Pei Yuanqing was ambushed and killed by Xin Wenli with explosive powders.

== Family ==
Notable ancestors:

- Feizi: Founder of State of Qin in ancient times
- Pei Zhen: A noble man in Spring and Autumn period
- Pei Mao: A mid-ranked official in the central court of Han dynasty
- Pei Weng: Chancellor in Jin dynasty
- Pei Shuanghu: Guard of Hedong Prefecture in Northern Wei dynasty

Great Grandfather:

- Pei Bofeng: Duke of Langya Prefecture and governor of Fenzhou in Northern Zhou dynasty

Grandfather:

- Pei Dinggao: Governor of Fengyi County in Northern Zhou dynasty

Father:

- Pei Renji: Duke of Hedong Prefecture in Sui dynasty

Brother:

- Pei Xingjian: General-in-chief of Right Guard Army; Duke of Wenxi Prefecture in Tang dynasty

Nephews:

- Pei Zhenying: A general in Shaonan Fu
- Pei Yanxiu: County magistrate of Wenshui
- Pei Qingyuan: A low-ranked officer in the central court of Tang dynasty in charge of sacrificial ceremonies
- Pei Guangting: Chancellor and the chief minister of Ministry of Personnel during Emperor Xuanzong's reign
