= Zhang Xutuo =

Sui Chinese military general

- 张须陀
- Born: 566; Hongnong Commandery
- Died: December 616 (aged 49–50); Dahai Temple near Xingyang
- Burial place: Lingbao City, Henan, China
- Occupation: General
- Children: 1 son

Zhang Xutuo, courtesy name Guo, (566 - December 616) was one of the most celebrated generals during the Sui dynasty. He was best known for his achievements in suppressing rebellions and uprisings during Emperor Yang's reign.

== In history ==
Zhang Xutuo originally served in the military under the command of Shi Wansui during the campaign against Cuanman in 597. After this campaign, he was promoted to be a mid-ranked officer. In 604, Emperor Yang's younger brother Yang Liang rebelled against the emperor seeking for the throne. Zhang Xutuo took part in the campaign against Yang Liang under the command of Yang Su. he was promoted again after this battle.

In 610, Zhang Xutuo became a local governor of Qi Prefecture. At that time, Sui dynasty was invading the Goguryeo and there was no cereals left in the barns of Qi. Coincidentally, Qi Prefecture suffered from natural disasters during the same year. Zhang Xutuo thus ordered to hand out everything left in the storage to save people. His advisors warmed him that he had no authority to do this, but he did it anyway at the risk of being punished by the emperor. As a result, he obtained great reputation among people in Qi Prefecture, and the emperor was also very proud of what he did.

In 611, led by Wang Bo, the first peasant uprising of Sui dynasty broke out in Zouping region near Qi Prefecture. Zhang Xutuo led his troop to Zouping and drove out the peasant force. Wang Bo retreated to Lu Prefecture and then to Mountain Tai, but still, he was eventually defeated by Zhang Xutuo. Wang Bo ran to the north and was ambushed by Zhang Xutuo again near the Yellow River. Wang Bo's uprising triggered massive peasant rebellions all around the Sui dynasty. He had to run further north. In 613, Wang Bo, allied with other peasant forces, such as Sun Xuanya and Hao Xiaode, went back and fought against Zhang Xutuo. Zhang Xutuo, allied with another Sui general Zhou Fashang, attacked the peasant alliance near Zhangqiu and seriously weakened the peasant force. Wang Bo, Sun Xuanya and Hao Xiaode fled away and eventually submitted to Dou Jiande. After this battle, Zhang Xutuo was praised by the emperor for his bravery and intelligence. The emperor even ordered to have a copy of Zhang's portrayal hanging on the wall in his palace.

After the battle at Zhangqiu, Zhang Xutuo continued fighting against rebellion forces. Major peasant rebels in Shandong region including Pei Changcai, Shi Zihe, Guo Fangyu, Zuo Xiaoyou, Lu Mingyue, Lyu Mingxing, Shuai Rentai and Huo Xiaohan were all defeated by Zhang Xutuo. Zhang Xutuo also discovered and promoted several talented warriors, including Qin Shubao and Luo Shixin, from his troops. In 614, Zhang Xutuo was appointed by the central court as the chief commander of Eastern China and the guard of Qi.

In December 616, Zhang Xutuo met his strongest opponent in the battlefield, the Wagang Army led by Zhai Rang and Li Mi. During the Battle of Dahai Temple against Wagang Army, Zhang Xutuo was ambushed and surrounded by Wagang forces led by Wang Bodang, Shan Xiongxin and Xu Shiji, near the city of Xingyang. He managed to break the encirclement after a bloody battle, but he went back into the encirclement after realizing that some of his subordinates, such as Fan Hu and Tang Wanren, were still desperately fighting in the field. He charged at Wagang Army for several times trying to save his subordinates, but he failed and was eventually killed in the battle by Wagang Army. After the battle, his surviving troops all cried for him, and the emperor was very sad after hearing this news.

Zhang Xutuo was buried on the site of the battlefield. Later, during the Tang dynasty, his grandsons relocated his grave to Lingbao on 20 March 711. His grave was discovered by archaeologists in 2009. According to the record on his tombstone, he was also good at writing and literature.

== In popular cultures ==
Although Zhang Xutuo rarely appears in folk tales or dramas, his stories triggered the creation of the fictional person called Yang Lin, who was believed to be one of the best warriors of Sui dynasty, and was given the title of Prince of Backing (Kaoshan Wang) by the emperor.

== Family ==
Notable ancestor:

- Zhang Wen: a chancellor during the Eastern Han dynasty

Great Grandfather:

- Zhang Qing: A local governor of Hongnong in Northern Wei dynasty

Grandfather:

- Zhang Si: a high-ranked official in the central court of Western Wei dynasty

Father:

- Zhang Mou: a local governor of Ruzhou in Northern Zhou dynasty

Son:

- Zhang Yuanbei: a lower-ranked general

Grandsons:

- Zhang Zhizhi
- Zhang Zhixuan
