= Luo Shixin =

Seventh century Chinese general

- 罗士信

Personal details
- Born: c. 600; Licheng
- Died: 622; Southern Hebei
- Occupation: General
- Title: Duke of Tan

Luo Shixin (c. 600–622) was a general during the transitional period between the Sui and Tang dynasties of China.

== History ==
Luo Shixin was originally a young soldier under Zhang Xutuo, one of top generals of the Sui dynasty during Emperor Yang's reign. In 613, when he was only 14 years old, Luo Shixin fought in various battles against peasant uprisings in the Shandong region. His bravery left a deep impression on Zhang Xutuo. Afterwards, Luo Shixin continued serving in Zhang Xutuo's army. He gradually became famous within Sui armies in which he served as well as within many rebellious forces. Because he was strong and brave in the battle, it was commonly believed that his enemies would be scared after hearing his name. Even Emperor Yang knew him by name and commended him, which was rare for a soldier of his rank.

In 614, Luo Shixin and Qin Shubao played key roles in defeating the peasant army led by Lu Mingyue. In 616, Zhang Xutuo was killed in battle. Luo Shixin thus became a soldier under Pei Renji, another Sui general. Pei Renji relied heavily on Luo Shixin in battle and treated him very well. However, in 617, Pei Renji was defeated by Wagang Army and surrendered, while Luo Shixin also joined the Wagang Army while being promoted to be a commander.

Not long afterwards, Luo Shixin was captured by Wang Shichong, another rebellion warlord based in Luoyang, during a battle. Wang Shichong knew that Luo Shixin had great talent, so he treated Luo Shixin well and tried to let him surrender. However, Luo Shixin disliked Wang Shichong and thought that Wang Shichong would eventually be defeated. He was especially disappointed after Wang Shichong executed Pei Renji and Pei Xingyan. After some struggles and conflicts with Wang Shichong's nephew, Luo Shixin escaped from Luoyang and submitted to the emerging Tang dynasty instead. Emperor Gaozu was delighted to get Luo Shixin, and immediately promoted Luo Shixin to be a high-ranked general. From 620 to 621, Luo Shixin took part in the campaign against Wang Shichong and Dou Jiande. He played a key role in Battle of Hulao in which Tang forces completely destroyed the allied force between Wang and Dou. In order to reward his contributions, Emperor Gaozu gave Luo Shixin the title Duke of Tan.

In 622, Luo Shixin took part in the campaign against Liu Heita. At that time, another general of Tang named Wang Junkuo was guarding a small city by the Ming River (near today's Shahe). Wang Junkuo was struggling under Liu Heita's attacks, and the reinforcement army led by Li Shimin failed to approach the city after three tries. Luo Shixin thus led his division charging toward the city. He communicated with Wang Junkuo with flag signals, and successfully joined force with Wang Junkuo after opening up a pathway in Liu Heita's formations. Later, Wang Junkuo broke out of the encirclement, but Luo Shixin and his 200 men were trapped by Liu Heita's army. Luo Shixin was eventually captured by Liu's army. Liu Heita wanted Luo Shixin to surrender but Luo Shixin refused, so Liu Heita executed Luo Shixin. Li Shimin was sad to hear about the death of Luo Shixin, bought his body back from Liu Heita and buried him ceremoniously near the tomb of his former superior Pei Renji.

== In popular culture ==
Luo Shixin's stories triggered the creation of the semi-fictional figure Luo Cheng in many folk tales. In those tales, he was said to be a son of Luo Yi and cousin of Qin Shubao, and was one of the greatest warriors at that time. In some other versions, Luo Shixin was described as a naïve and clumsy soldier but has a strength that could rival the best warrior at his time.
