= Cheng Yaojin =

Chinese general, politician (589–665)

Cheng Zhijie 程知節
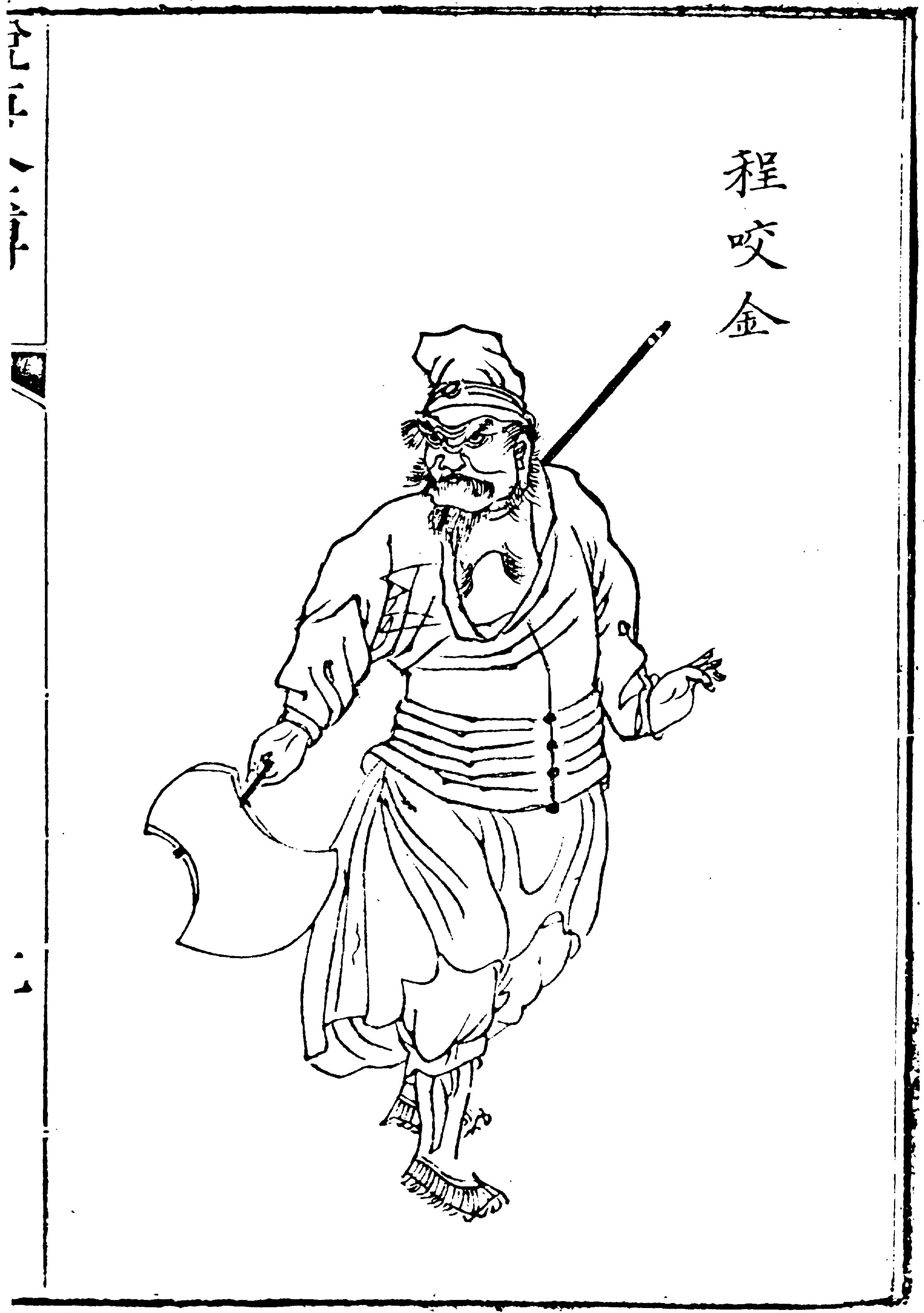
- Born: 589; Dongping County, Shandong
- Died: 26 February 665 (aged 76); Xi'an, Shaanxi
- Resting place: Liquan County, Shaanxi
- Other names: Cheng Yaojin (程咬金); Yizhen (義貞); Duke Xiang of Lu (盧襄公)
- Occupation: General
- Spouses: Lady Sun; Lady Cui
- Children: Cheng Chumo; Cheng Chuliang; Cheng Chubi
- Father: Cheng Lou

Cheng Zhijie (589 – 26 February 665), courtesy name Yizhen, better known by his original name Cheng Yaojin, was a Chinese general who served under the emperors Gaozu, Taizong and Gaozong in the early Tang dynasty. His portrait was on display in Lingyan Pavilion along with those of another 23 officials who rendered meritorious service to the Tang Empire during the reign of Emperor Taizong.

== Background ==
Cheng Yaojin was born during the Sui dynasty in Dong'e County (東阿縣), Ji Prefecture (濟州), which is located southwest of present-day Dongping County, Tai'an, Shandong. He was highly skilled in horse-riding and using the shuo (槊; a type of long spear).

Cheng Yaojin's great-grandfather, Cheng Xing (程興), served as a Major (司馬) in Yan Prefecture (兗州; around present-day Jining, Shandong) during the Northern Qi dynasty. His grandfather, Cheng Zhe (程哲), also served as a Major in Huang Prefecture (黃州; around present-day Hengyang, Hunan) under the Northern Qi regime. His father, Cheng Lou (程婁), served as a Senior Rectifier (大中正) in Ji Prefecture (濟州; covering parts of present-day Liaocheng, Shandong and Puyang, Henan) and the Prefect (刺史) of Ying Prefecture (瀛州; around present-day Hejian, Hebei).

== Service under Li Mi and Wang Shichong ==
Towards the end of the Sui dynasty, chaos broke out throughout China and bandits were rampant. Cheng rallied hundreds of followers to defend their hometown from attacks and raids by bandits. He later came to serve the rebel leader Li Mi, who treated him respectfully and generously and made him a bodyguard. Cheng was also a commander of the 8,000 horsemen who formed the "Inner Corps" (內軍) of Li's army. Li was at war with another rebel leader, Wang Shichong. Cheng led a cavalry detachment and was stationed at Beimang (北邙; in western Henan at the northern part of the Qin Mountains range) while his colleague Shan Xiongxin garrisoned at Yanshi (偃師; present-day Yanshi, Luoyang, Henan). When Wang attacked Shan Xiongxin's position, Li sent Cheng and Pei Xingyan to lead troops to reinforce Shan. Pei was hit by an arrow in the midst of battle and fell off his horse. Cheng fought his way through enemy lines, rescued Pei, brought him onto horseback and rode off. Wang's men tried to stop them with long spears, but Cheng broke the spears, killed the pursuers and managed to escape to safety.

Cheng became a prisoner-of-war after Li was defeated by Wang. Although Wang treated him generously, he still felt disgruntled with Wang's ways and complained about Wang to his former colleague, Qin Qiong. When Wang was at war with the Tang faction led by Li Yuan at Jiuqu (九曲), Cheng and Qin defected to the Tang side on the battlefield along with their followers. Wang was afraid of them so he did not order his men to stop them.

== Service under Emperor Gaozu ==
The faction led by Li eventually formed the Tang dynasty while Li himself became historically known as "Emperor Gaozu of Tang". Cheng was appointed as a military officer under Li Yuan's second son, Li Shimin. He fought for the Tang Empire against rival warlords such as Wang Shichong, Song Jingang (宋金剛) and Dou Jiande, who were either defeated or surrendered to Tang. Cheng was enfeoffed as the "Duke of Su" (宿國公) for his contributions in battle.

In 624, when there was an ongoing rivalry between Li Shimin and his eldest brother, Li Jiancheng (the Crown Prince), over the succession to their father's throne, Li Jiancheng became very suspicious and distrustful of Cheng. Emperor Gaozu appointed Cheng as the Prefect of Kang Prefecture (康州; around present-day Zhaoqing, Guangdong), effectively sending him far away from the capital, Chang'an (present-day Xi'an, Shaanxi). Cheng told Li Shimin, "Great Prince, if you lose your left and right arms, you will not survive long. I will not leave you, even if it means I will die." On 2 July 626, Cheng joined Li Shimin in assassinating Li Jiancheng and his fourth brother, Li Yuanji (the Prince of Qi), at the Xuanwu Gate Incident, after which Li Shimin became the new Crown Prince. He was appointed as a "Right Guard Commander to the Crown Prince" (太子右衛率) and subsequently promoted to "Right Martial Guard Senior General" (右武衛大將軍) and awarded 700 taxable households in his dukedom.

== Service under Emperor Taizong ==
Li Shimin eventually succeeded his father and became historically known as "Emperor Taizong of Tang". During Emperor Taizong's reign, Cheng Yaojin served as the Grand Viceroy of Lu Prefecture (瀘州; around present-day Luzhou, Sichuan) and "Left Commanding Senior General" (左領軍大將軍). He and his colleague, Zhangsun Wuji, were granted permission to allow their descendants to inherit their governorship over their respective prefectures. His ducal title was later changed to "Duke of Lu" (盧國公) and he was appointed as the Prefect of Pu Prefecture (普州; around present-day Ziyang, Sichuan). In 643, he was reassigned to be the "Left Garrison Guardian Senior General" (左屯衛大將軍), put in command of the Northern Garrison, and promoted to "Senior General Who Defends the Army" (鎮軍大將軍).

Emperor Taizong ordered the artist Yan Liben to paint life-sized portraits of Cheng Yaojin and another 23 officials who rendered meritorious service to the Tang Empire. The 24 portraits were put on display in Lingyan Pavilion.

== Service under Emperor Gaozong ==
Cheng Yaojin outlived Emperor Taizong and continued serving under Emperor Taizong's successor, Emperor Gaozong. In 655, he was appointed as "Left Guardian Senior General" (左衛大將軍). In 657, he participated in the Tang campaign against the Western Turks. When his army reached Hengdu City (怛篤城; present-day location uncertain), thousands of civilians came out of their homes to surrender, but Cheng Yaojin ordered his troops to massacre the city's population and the Turkic army used the opportunity to retreat further. Cheng Yaojin was stripped of his military command after he returned from the campaign, but was later appointed as the Prefect of Qi Prefecture (岐州; around present-day Baoji, Shaanxi). However, he wrote a memorial to Emperor Gaozong, requesting to retire. The emperor approved his request.

== Family ==
Cheng had three sons: Cheng Chumo (程處默), Cheng Chuliang (程處亮) and Cheng Chubi (程處弼). Cheng Chumo inherited his father's ducal title and dukedom as the "Duke of Lu" (盧國公). Cheng Chuliang married Emperor Taizong's daughter, Princess Qinghe (清河公主), and held the positions of Chief Commandant of Escorting Cavalry (駙馬都尉) and Left Guard General of the Household (左衛中郎將). Cheng Chubi served as Right Jinwu General (右金吾將軍). Cheng Chubi's son, Cheng Boxian (程伯獻), served as Left Jinwu Senior General (左金吾大將軍) during the reign of Emperor Xuanzong.

== Death ==
Cheng died in his home in Huaide Village (懷德里) on 26 February 665. He was 77 (by East Asian age reckoning) at the time of his death. He was posthumously honoured as "Senior General of Chariots and Cavalry" (驃騎大將軍) and Grand Viceroy of Yi Prefecture (益州; covering parts of the Sichuan basin). He was buried in the Zhao Mausoleum, where Emperor Taizong was interred.

Cheng's tomb is located in the Zhao Mausoleum in present-day Liquan County, Xianyang, Shaanxi. The tombstone was unearthed in 1986 and bore the heading "Tomb of the Late Lord Cheng, Senior General of Chariots and Cavalry and Duke of Lu of the Great Tang Empire". The tombstone was 78 cm long and 15 cm thick. Cheng's biography was inscribed on the tombstone by Xu Jingzong and contained more than 2,000 hanzis. There are additional details about his life inscribed on the tombstone that were not recorded in his official biographies in the Old Book of Tang and New Book of Tang.

== In popular culture ==
Cheng Yaojin is often depicted in Chinese folklore and popular culture as a somewhat inept and bumbling warrior who sometimes shows up at the right place and right time to save the day. There are two popular Chinese sayings related to Cheng Yaojin:

- "Cheng Yaojin shows up suddenly along the way" (Chinese: 半路殺出個程咬金): Used to describe a situation where someone shows up unexpectedly and disrupts a plan. It is also used to describe an unwelcome busybody who shows up where he/she is not wanted.
- "Cheng Yaojin and his three axe strokes" (Chinese: 程咬金三板斧): Used to describe someone with a limited repertoire of skills, i.e. someone relying on the same old tricks.

Cheng Yaojin is portrayed by Hong Kong actor Wong Chun in TVB's 1985 series The General That Never Was, its 1986 sequels General Father General Son and Destined to Rebel as well as its 1987 series The Grand Canal (大運河)
