= Zhai Rang =

Zhai Rang (Chinese: 翟讓; died December 14, 617) was a key agrarian rebel leader near the end of the Chinese Sui dynasty. Believing prophecies that appeared to indicate that Li Mi would be emperor, he supported Li as leader and offered to serve under Li, but soon they began to have conflicts over distribution of spoils. In the winter of 617, Li ambushed and murdered Zhai at a feast, seizing his troops.

== Background ==
Not much is known about Zhai Rang's personal background. (Note: Vol.183 of Zizhi Tongjian recorded that Zhai was from Weicheng (韦城). The He Luo Ji (《河洛记》) recorded that Shan Xiongxin was from the same commandery as Zhai, which was the account used by Zizhi Tongjian; see Zizhi Tongjian Kaoyi, vol.08.) In or prior to 616, he was serving as the sheriff of Dong Commandery (東郡, roughly modern Anyang, Henan), when he was accused of crimes and sentenced to death. The jailer Huang Junhan (黃君漢), who had been impressed with Zhai's bravery, secretly released him at night. Zhai then fled to nearby Wagang (瓦崗) and gathered a group of men to rise against Emperor Yang of Sui's rule. Two of his key followers were Shan Xiongxin (單雄信) and Xu Shiji, who suggested him that he could supply his men without pillaging the people of the locale, but that because the Bian River (汴水) flowed through nearby Yingyang (滎陽, roughly modern Zhengzhou, Henan) and Liang (梁郡, roughly modern Shangqiu, Henan) Commanderies and carried heavy river traffic, all they would need to do was to pillage the river traffic. Zhai did so, and his men began to gather wealth. More and more desperate men joined Zhai, and he gathered more than 10,000 men.

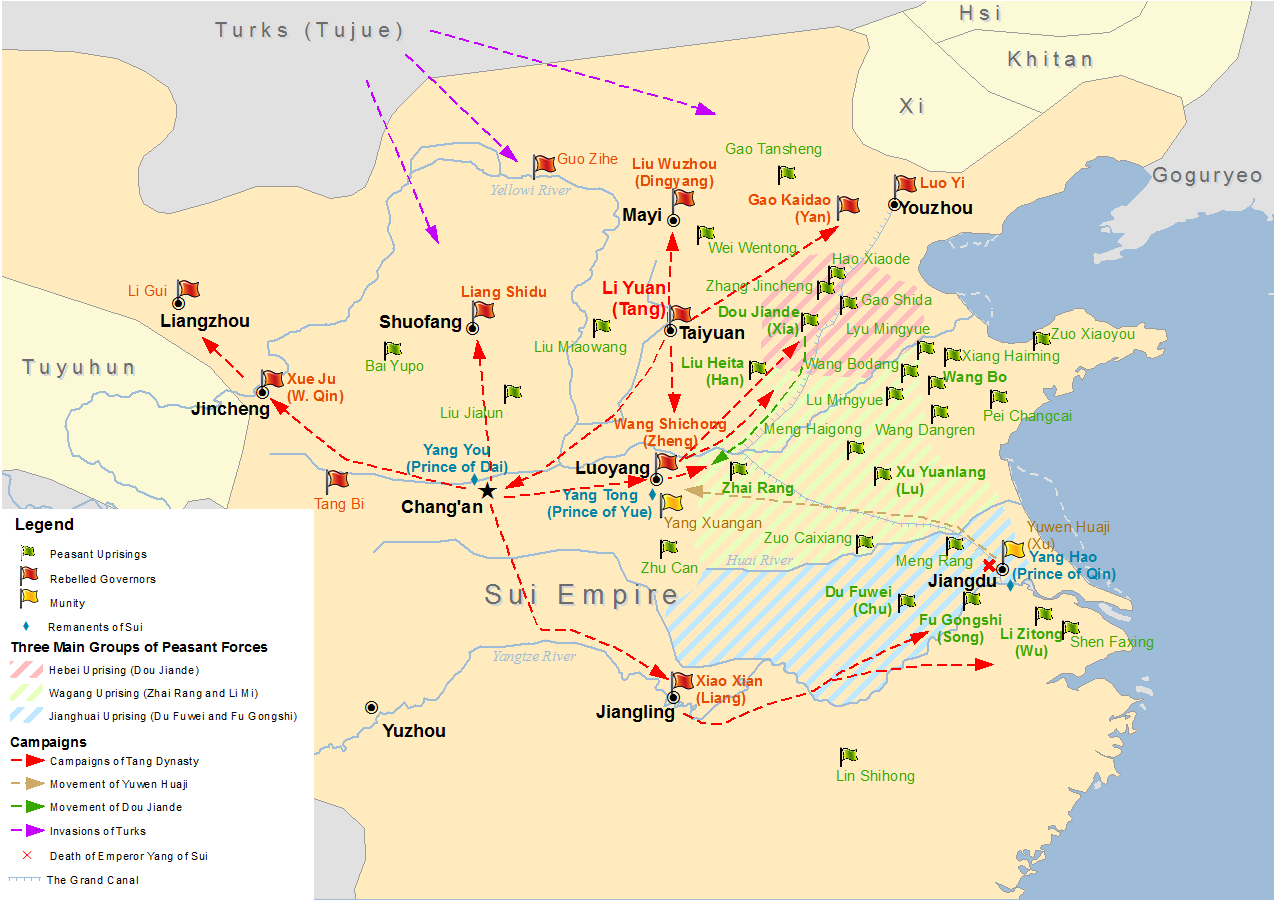
Map showing major uprisings and rebellions in the last years of Sui dynasty. Zhai Rang's uprising occurred at Wagang in the present Henan Province, and the region controlled by Wagang Army is shown as shade in light green.

Meanwhile, Li Mi, who had been the rebel general Yang Xuangan's chief strategist in Yang's uprising in 613 and who had been fleeing from place to place since, was trying to find a rebel leader who would cooperate with him. Initially, the rebel leaders all took him lightly as being overly ambitious, but eventually they began to consider his ambitions justified. Li, seeing that Zhai was the strongest rebel leader of the region, met Zhai through another rebel leader, Wang Bodang (王伯當). Li proposed some strategies for Zhai and was able to persuade some other rebel leaders to follow Zhai. Li therefore suggested to Zhai that, with Emperor Yang away at Jiangdu (江都, in modern Yangzhou, Jiangsu), he should gather his troops and attack Sui's two capitals: Luoyang and Chang'an. Zhai, not having the stomach yet for that grandiose design, did not accept the idea, but became more impressed with Li and kept Li as an honored guest.

Meanwhile, because of prophecies that the next emperor would be named Li, the rebel leaders began to believe that Li Mi might be the one prophesied. They thus began to submit to Li personally. When Zhai saw this, Zhai became even more impressed, and he considered accepting Li's plan. Li persuaded Zhai's strategist and astrologer Jia Xiong (賈雄) to persuade Jia to accept his plan. When Zhai asked Jia whether the signs indicated that Li's plan could succeed, Jia told him that it would, but that he might not be successful himself as the emperor, but should support Li. Zhai believed Jia and began to honor Li further. Under Li's advice, Zhai began to attack and capture the various cities within Yingyang Commandery. In response, Emperor Yang sent the general Zhang Xutuo (張須陀), who had previously been successful against rebel leaders, to attack Zhai. Zhai, who has previously lost some battles against Zhang, became fearful, but Li persuaded him that Zhang could be defeated. Under Li's suggestion, Zhai had Li take a thousand-man army and hide in a forest. As Zhang attacked Zhai, Li surprised Zhang, and Li, Zhai, Xu, and Wang surrounded Zhang. Zhang was initially able to fight his way out of the encirclement, but as he tried to rescue some of his officers, he was killed in battle. Zhai's reputation was greatly enhanced, and he was able to gather much food. In light of the victory, Zhai let Li set up his own army, known as the Army of the Duke of Pushan. As Li's army grew, Zhai's soldiers began to have friction with Li's. Zhai thus separated his army from Li's and returned to Wagang, but soon regretted that decision and rejoined Li.

== Support of Li Mi ==
In spring 617, Li persuaded Zhai that, with Emperor Yang away and his grandson Yang Tong the Prince of Yue in charge at Luoyang, the officials there were not of one mind. They thus sent Pei Shufang (裴叔方) to Luoyang to scout it, but Pei was discovered, and the Sui officials at Luoyang began to prepare for an attack. In response, Li and Zhai launched their assault at Luokou Storage (洛口倉), a massive food storage that Emperor Yang built, and they captured it. They opened the food storage to allow the people to take food, and many people joined them. The Sui generals Liu Changgong (劉長恭) and Fang Shi (房崱), viewing Zhai's forces as nothing more than bandits looking for food, took them lightly and attacked. Li and Zhai wore out the army from Luoyang with hunger, and then attacked, defeating it.

In the aftermaths of the battle, Zhai Rang supported Li Mi as leader and offered the title of Duke of Wei—a title that Li's grandfather Li Yao (李曜) had previously carried during Northern Zhou—to Li. Li accepted, and changed the era name to show independence from Sui. Li made Zhai his prime minister and created him the Duke of Dong Commandery. Once Li made his declaration, the rebel generals of the region largely submitted to him, and much of modern central and eastern Henan came under Li's rule. However, after Sui reinforcements arrived from Jiangdu under the command of Wang Shichong, Li's advances, while initially successful over Wang as well, became stalled.

== Death ==
By winter 617, there began to be friction between Zhai and several other generals under Li. Zhai's associate Wang Ruxin (王儒信) and brother Zhai Hong (翟弘) the Duke of Yingyang had both suggested Zhai seize power as regent and strip Li of his powers—suggestions that Zhai did not accept but Li eventually heard about. Zhai was also becoming greedy with spoils of war—torturing the general Cui Shishu (崔世樞) for money, battering Xing Yiqi (邢義期) for refusing to gamble with him, and demanding large amounts of treasure from Fang Yanzao (房彥藻), going as far as telling Fang:

When you recently attacked Ru'nan, you captured much gold, silver, and jewels, but you only gave them to the Duke of Wei, giving none to me. Be aware that it is I who allowed him to be duke, and who knows what will happen in the future?

In fear, Fang informed this to Li, and he and Zheng Ting (鄭頲) both suggested that Li ambush Zhai. Li initially hesitated, believing that this would cause disunity among the ranks, but Zheng finally persuaded him that Zhai was too much of a risk. At a feast that Li held for Zhai Rang, Zhai Hong, Pei Renji (裴仁基), and Hao Xiaode (郝孝德), Li thus had his guard Cai Jiande (蔡建德) assassinate Zhai Rang, and then executed Zhai Hong, Zhai Rang's nephew Zhai Mohou (翟摩侯), and Wang Ruxin. Both Shan Xiongxin and Xu Shiji were also almost killed, but at the order of Wang Bodang, they were spared, and Li subsequently transferred Zhai's forces to Shan, Xu, and Wang Bodang.

However, Li Mi ultimately failed, and later Sheng Yanshi (盛彥師) captured and executed Li Mi.

== Notes and references ==
- Zizhi Tongjian, vols. 183, 184.
