= Qin Shubao =

Tang Dynasty general (died 638) and deity

Qin Qiong 秦瓊
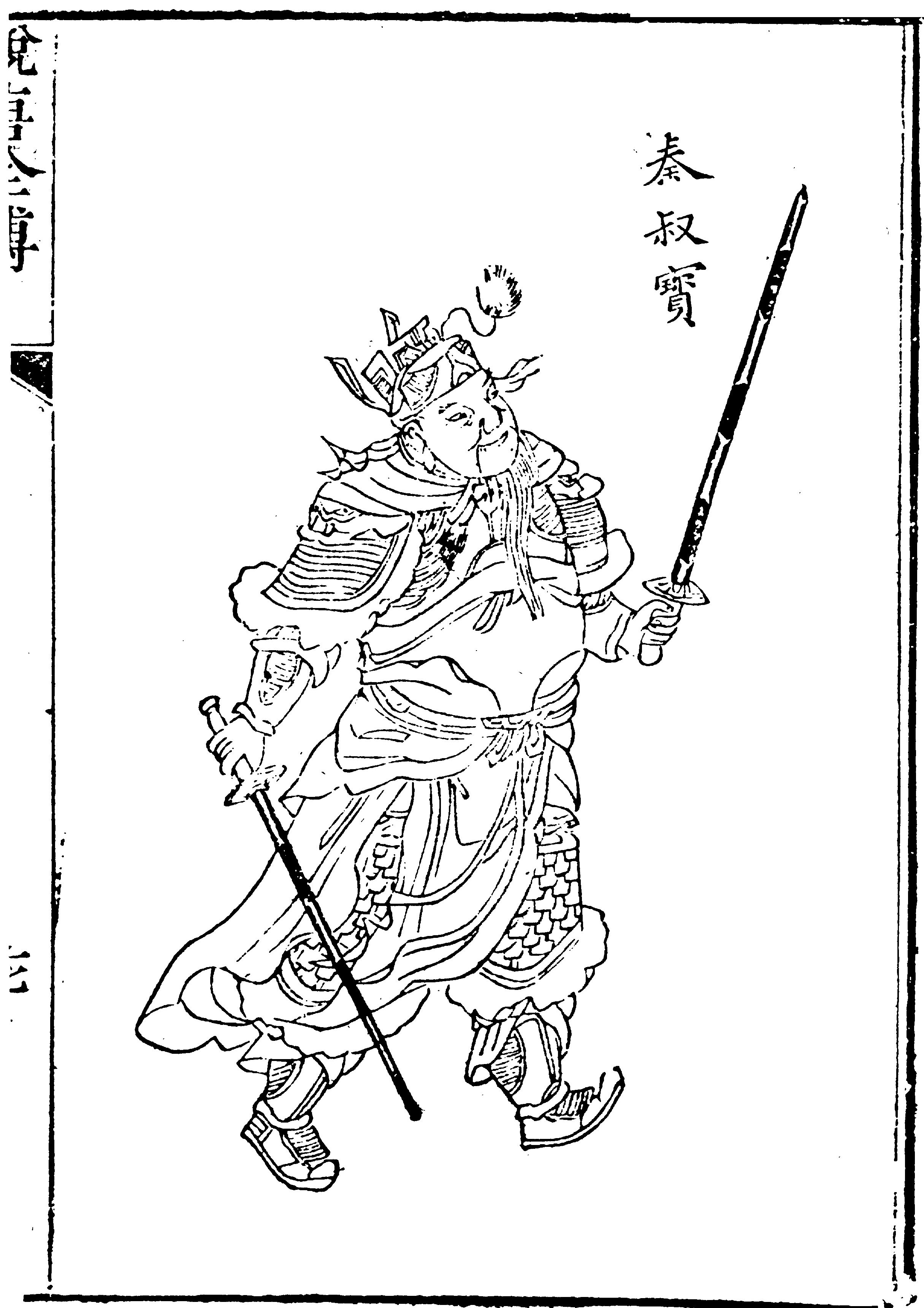
- Qing depiction of Qin Qiong from Shuotang
- Born: Unknown; Licheng, Qi Prefecture, Northern Qi (today Jinan, Shandong)
- Died: 638; Chang'an, Tang Empire (today Xi'an, Shaanxi)
- Other names: Shubao (叔寶); Duke Zhuang of Hu (胡壯公)
- Occupation: General
- Children: Qin Huaidao; Qin Shandao; one other son
- Father: Qin Ai

Qin Qiong (died 638), courtesy name Shubao, better known as Qin Shubao, was a Chinese general who lived in the early Tang dynasty of China. Along with Yuchi Gong, he continues to be worshipped in China as a door god. He is also known by his posthumous name Duke Zhuang of Hu.

== During Sui dynasty ==
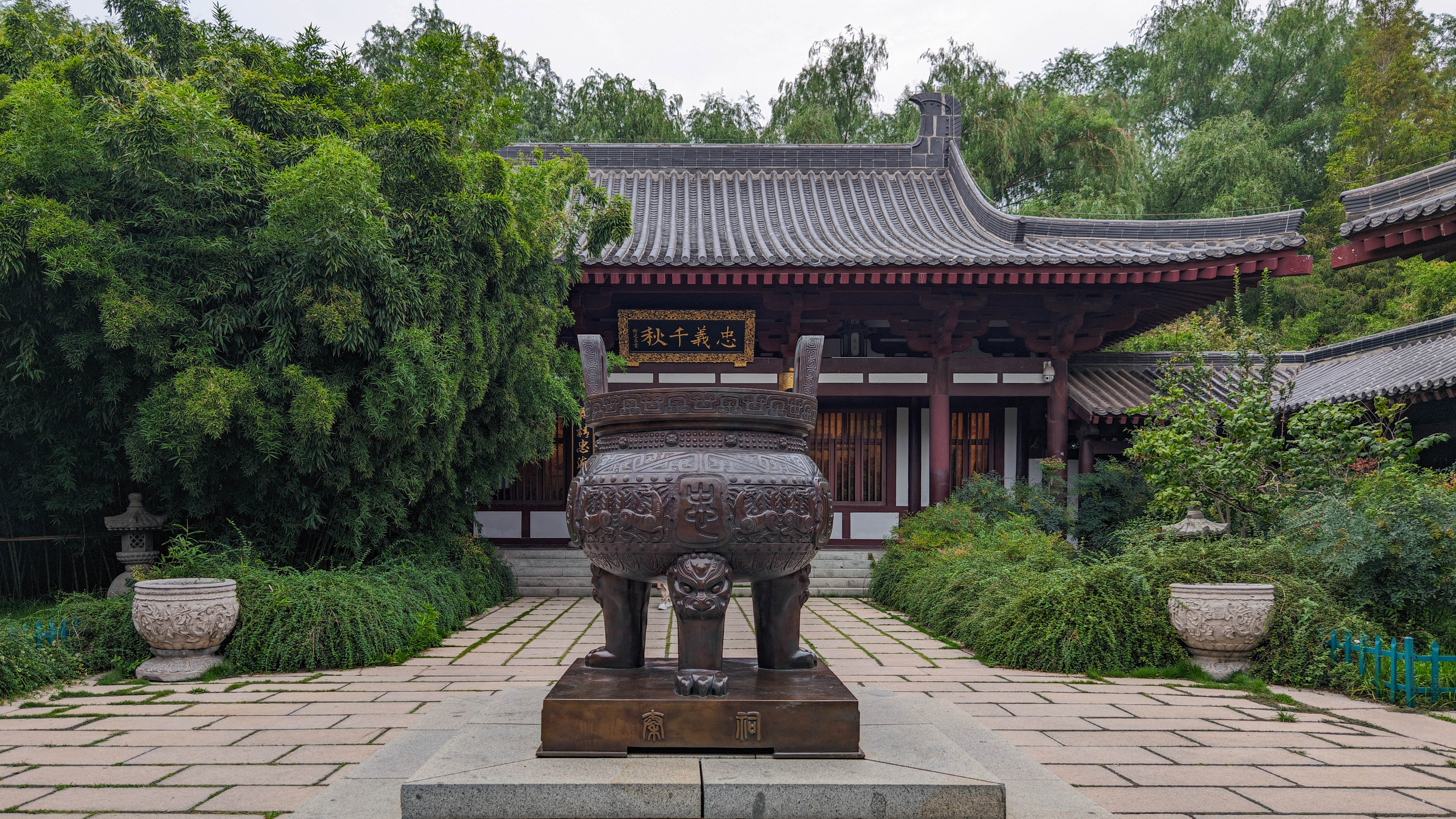
Birth and resident place of Qin Qiong in Five Dragon Pool, Jinan

It is not known when Qin Shubao was born, but it was known that he was from Qi Prefecture (齊州, roughly modern Jinan, Shandong). He became a soldier under the service of the major general Lai Hu'er during the reign of Emperor Yang of Sui. When Qin's mother died, Lai, extraordinarily, sent a messenger to mourn her death, and when Lai's secretary found this odd, Lai responded, "This man is brave and fierce, and he is also full of ambition and integrity. One day he will gain his own honors, and I cannot treat him as if he were base."

Late in Emperor Yang's reign, Qin served under the general Zhang Xutuo. In 614, when Zhang was facing the agrarian rebel general Lu Mingyue (盧明月) with no more than 20,000 men, while Lu had more than 100,000 men, Zhang planned to set a trap where he would retreat, wait for Lu to chase after him, and then send part of his army to launch a surprise attack on Lu's base. The mission was considered dangerous, but Qin and another officer, Luo Shixin, volunteered, and so Zhang gave them 1,000 men each and had them hide. Zhang then withdrew, and when Lu gave chase, Qin and Luo fought their way into Lu's camp, causing Lu's forces to panic and allowing Zhang to defeat and capture most of Lu's men. Qin also later defeated another rebel general, Sun Xuanya (孫宣雅), and was promoted in rank.

In 616, with the major rebel leaders Zhai Rang and Li Mi threatening the eastern capital Luoyang, Emperor Yang sent Zhang to attack them, and Qin followed Zhang. Zhang, however, was killed in battle, and Qin thereafter served under the command of the general Pei Renji (裴仁基). In 617, Pei, angry that he was not awarded for his victories and fearful that other Sui officials were defaming him, surrendered to Li, and Qin came under Li's command. Li put him and Cheng Zhijie in charge of his guard corps of 8,000 men, and stated, "These 8,000 men are capable of standing up against a million men."

== Service under Li Mi and Wang Shichong ==
In 618, Emperor Yang was killed in a coup at Jiangdu (江都, in modern Yangzhou, Jiangsu), led by the general Yuwen Huaji. Yuwen subsequently abandoned Jiangdu and advanced back north with the elite Xiaoguo Army (驍果), approaching Luoyang. Both Li Mi and the Sui officials at Luoyang (who declared Emperor Yang's grandson Yang Tong emperor) were apprehensive of Yuwen, and they forged an alliance. When Li Mi subsequently engaged Yuwen, during a battle, Li Mi was hit by an arrow and fell off his horse. The other guards were not around, and only Qin Shubao defended and saved him, and Qin then further fought Yuwen's troops, forcing them to withdraw back to camp. After a number of battles, Yuwen could not defeat Li Mi, and therefore left the area and crossed the Yellow River north.

Subsequently, however, the Sui general Wang Shichong overthrew the officials in favor of the peace with Li Mi, taking over as Yang Tong's regent, and later that year, he defeated Li Mi in a surprise attack. Li Mi fled to Tang dynasty territory and surrendered to Tang. Most of Li Mi's subordinates, including Qin and Cheng Zhijie, surrendered to Wang. Wang was impressed by both and treated both well, but they believed Wang to be treacherous and did not want to serve him. In 619, when the Tang general Li Shimin the Prince of Qin (Emperor Gaozu's son) was attacking Wang, Qin and Cheng, along with Wu Heita (吳黑闥) and Niu Jinda (牛進達), acted as if they were going to resist Tang forces but instead headed some distance away from Wang, and then got off their horses and bowed, stating to Wang:

We had received great honors from you, Duke, and we have long sought to repay your kindness. However, you are suspicious and often believe in defamations, and we cannot serve you. Please allow us to leave.

They then surrendered to Li Shimin.

== During Emperor Gaozu's reign ==
Emperor Gaozu put Qin Shubao under Li Shimin's command. Around the new year 620, with Liu Wuzhou the Dingyang Khan having seized most of Tang territory in modern Shanxi and aiming to attack further south, Emperor Gaozu sent Li Shimin to resist Liu, and Qin and Yin Kaishan were able to defeat Liu's general Yuchi Gong at Meiliang River (美良川, flowing through modern Yuncheng, Shanxi), repelling Yuchi's offensive. Impressed, Emperor Gaozu sent a messenger to award Qin a golden bottle, stating to him:

You disregarded your wife and children to follow me, and you have accomplished great things. If my flesh can be beneficial to you, I would be willing to cut it off for you, and I will spare no servants, jade, or silk. Be encouraged.

Qin then followed Li Shimin in defeating Liu's major general Song Jin'gang (宋金剛), contributing to Li Shimin's final victory over Liu later in 620. Emperor Gaozu awarded Qin with a large supply of gold and silk. Later that year, Li Shimin launched a major attack against Wang, who by this point had deposed Yang Tong and declared himself emperor of a new state of Zheng. During the campaign, Li Shimin selected some 1,000 elite soldiers, clad in black uniform and black armor, commanded by Li Shimin himself, to serve as the forward advance corps, with Qin, Cheng Zhijie, Yuchi (who by this point had surrendered to Tang), and Zhai Zhangsun (翟長孫) as his assistants. This corps subsequently accomplished much during the campaign against Wang and Dou Jiande the Prince of Xia, who came to Wang's aid. During initial engagement against Xia troops, Qin, Yuchi, and Li Shiji were able to defeat Xia forward troops, and Li Shimin subsequently wrote Dou, citing the battle as a reason why he should stop his campaign to aid Wang. Dou did not relent, and in summer 621, his and Li Shimin's troops engaged at the Battle of Hulao. Qin contributed much during the battle, which ended with Dou's being captured by Tang forces. Wang subsequently surrendered, and both Zheng and Xia territory were seized by Tang (although later that year Dou's general Liu Heita rose against Tang rule and briefly recaptured nearly all of Xia territory). For his achievements against Zheng and Xia forces, Qin was created the Duke of Yi. In 622, he also followed Li Shimin in fighting against Liu Heita.

It was said that whenever Qin was following Li Shimin in battle, where there would be enemy soldiers who dared to display their bravery and taunt Li Shimin, Li Shimin would send Qin to attack them, and often Qin was able to target them and destroy them. Li Shimin therefore was particularly impressed with him, and Qin was proud of his own abilities.

in 626, Li Shimin, then locked in an intense rivalry with his older brother Li Jiancheng the Crown Prince and fearful that Li Jiancheng would kill him, set an ambush for Li Jiancheng and another brother, Li Yuanji the Prince of Qi, who supported Li Jiancheng, at Xuanwu Gate. Qin was one of the key commanders of Li Shimin's forces, which subsequently killed Li Jiancheng and Li Yuanji. Li Shimin then effectively forced Emperor Gaozu to name him crown prince and then pass the throne to him (as Emperor Taizong).

== During Emperor Taizong's reign ==
Emperor Taizong increased Qin Shubao's fief by 700 households and gave him great honors. However, during Emperor Taizong's reign Qin was often ill. He once stated, "I had been a soldier since youth, and I have fought over 200 battles. I was often wounded, and I must have bled several hu [(斛, a large measurement unit)]. How could it be that I do not get sick?" He died in 638 and was buried near Emperor Taizong's future tomb. To commemorate Qin's battlefield accomplishments, Emperor Taizong ordered that statues of soldiers and horses be sculpted inside Qin's tomb. His title was posthumously changed to Duke of Hu in 639. In 643, when Emperor Taizong commissioned the Portraits at Lingyan Pavilion to commemorate the 24 great contributors to Tang rule, Qin's was one of the portraits commissioned.

== Popular culture ==
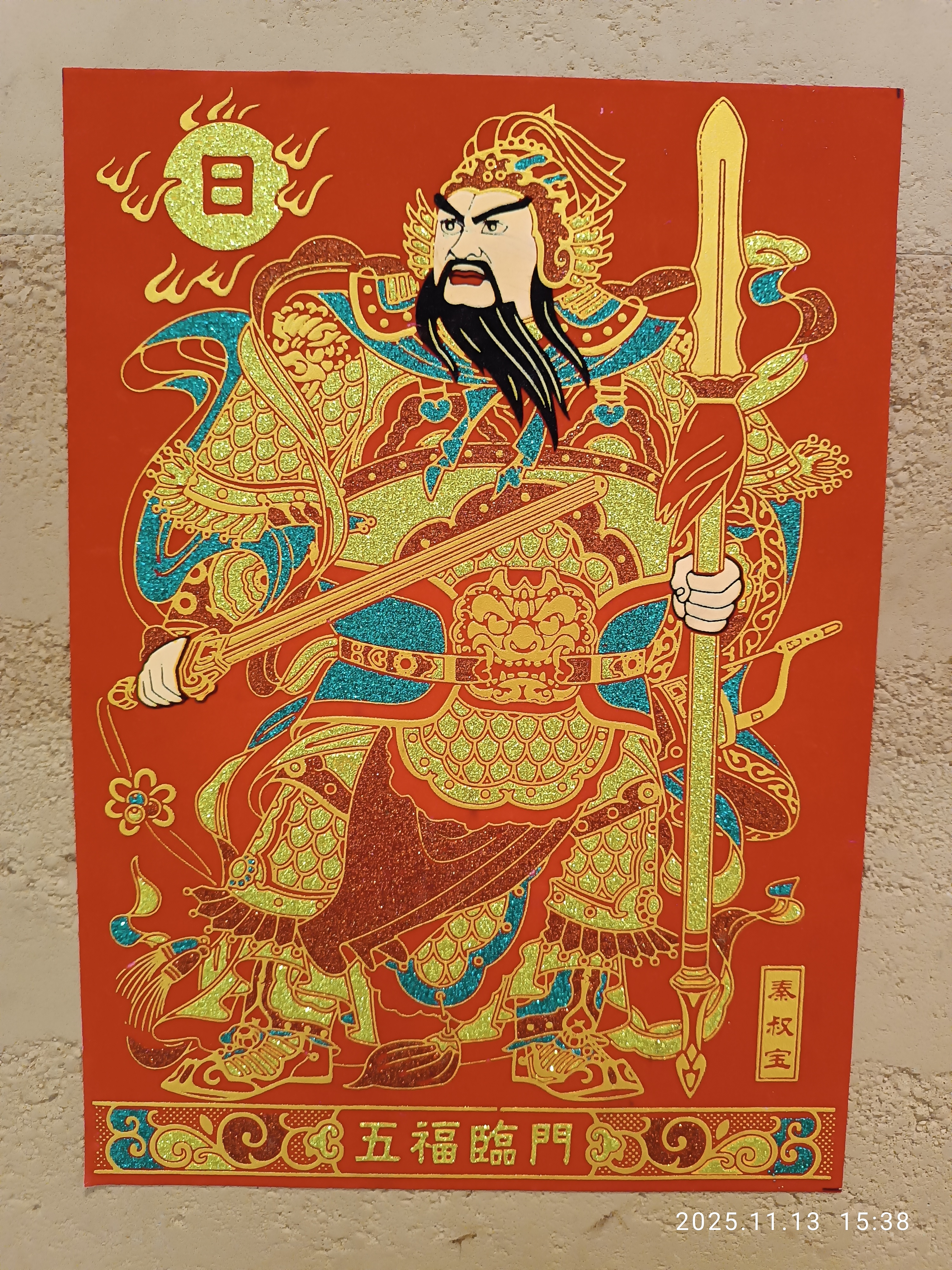
Portraits of Qin Shubao as Menshen

Qin Shubao continues to be venerated as a door god in Chinese folk religion. He is also one of the 32 historical figures who appear as special characters in the video game Romance of the Three Kingdoms XI by Koei. His formal name "Qin Qiong" is used in the game.

Qin Shubao is portrayed by Hong Kong actor Chan Wing Chun in TVB's 1987 series The Grand Canal (大運河).
