= Shan Xiongxin =

- 单雄信
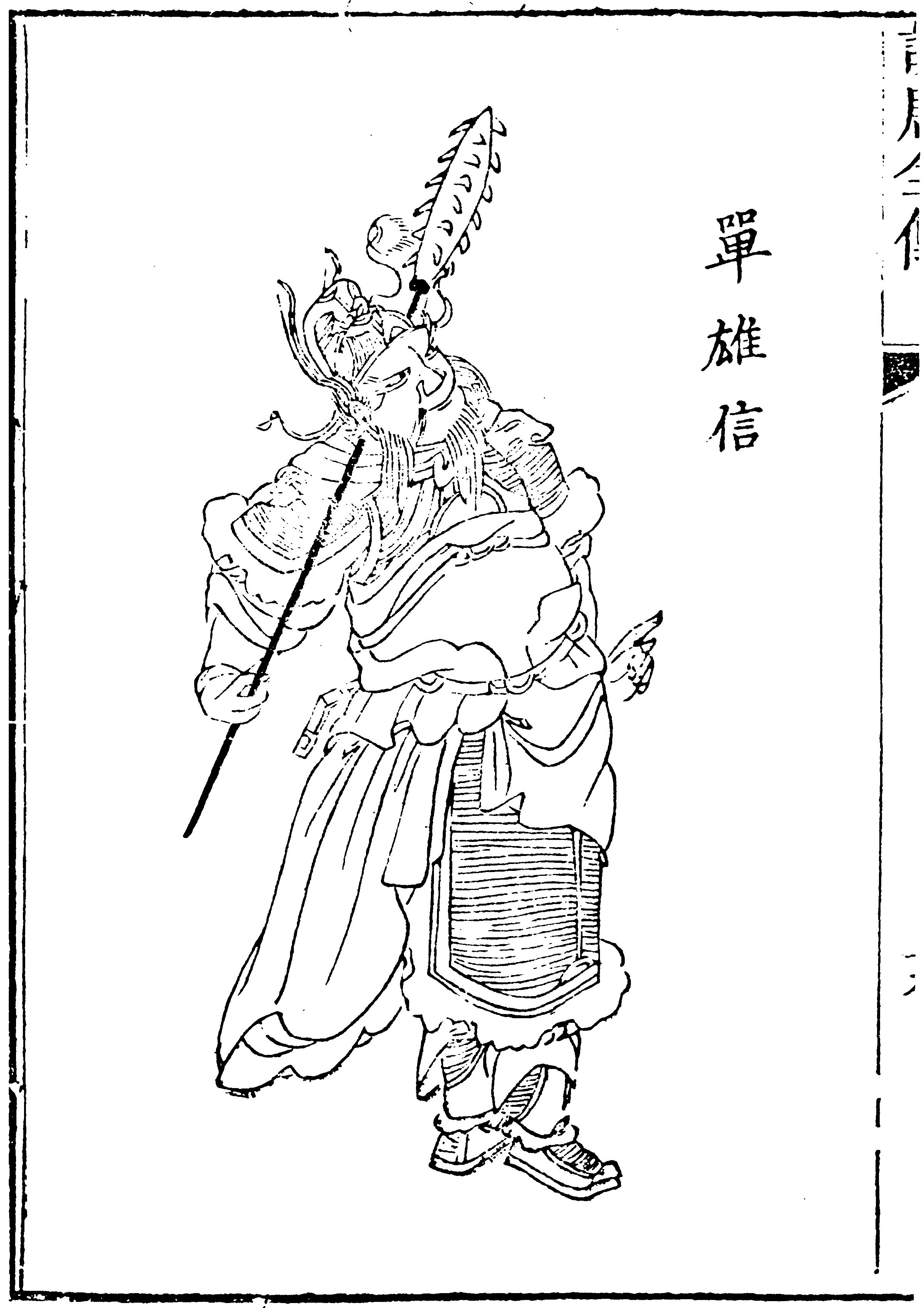

Left Wuhou General
- In office 617 – 618
- Monarch: Li Mi

Grand General
- In office 618 – 620
- Monarch: Wang Shichong

Personal details
- Born: unknown Caoxian
- Died: 5 June 621 Luoyang

Shan Xiongxin (? – 5 June 621 (Note: The Zizhi Tongjian mentioned that Shan Xiongxin was executed along with other supporters of Wang Shichong on the dingmao day of the 5th month of the 4th year of the Wude era of Li Yuan's reign. This corresponds to 5 Jun 621 on the Julian calendar.)) was a general, top warrior and peasant uprising leader during the transitional era between the Sui and Tang dynasties.

== In history ==
Shan Xiongxin was born in Caoxian, Shandong region. (Note: This is per both Books of Tang. The Zizhi Tongjian adopted the account found in the He Luo Ji (《河洛记》), which recorded that Shan Xiongxin was from the same commandery as Zhai. Vol.183 of Tongjian recorded that Zhai was from Weicheng (韦城).) He possessed great physical strength and specialised in the use of spears; he was nicknamed "Flying General" (飛將) for his martial prowess. When the uprising of Wagang Army broke out in 613, Shan Xiongxin and his friend Xu Shiji joined this peasant rebellion. Due to his bravery, he was soon promoted to become a general in the peasant army. In 617, after the highest power of the Wagang Army shifted from Zhai Rang to Li Mi, Shan Xiongxin was promoted to Left Wuhou General. After an internal struggle, Li Mi killed Zhai Rang. Li Mi's advisor Fang Yanzao suggested that Li Mi should kill Shan Xiongxin because Shan was a close follower to Zhai Rang. However, Li Mi did not kill Shan Xiongxin because he liked Shan's talent.

In 618, Shan Xiongxin took part in the battle between Wagang Army and Yuwen Huaji, who just executed the Emperor Yang of Sui earlier in the same year. Yuwen Huaji was seriously weakened in this battle and would finally be defeated by Dou Jiande. Later, Wagang Army started to fight against Wang Shichong, the warlord based in Luoyang. Li Mi underestimated Wang Shichong's strength and was defeated in Yanshi. Shan Xiongxin surrendered to Wang Shichong.

Wang Shichong named Shan Xiongxin as his grand general. In 620, Tang forces, led by Li Shimin, started to attack Wang Shichong, aiming to wipe him out and reunify China. Shan Xiongxin was the most reliable general fighting for Wang Shichong during this campaign. When Li Shimin was touring the Xuanwuling to inspect the frontline, Shan Xiongxin charged forth and engaged Li Shimin in a duel, and almost killed him. However, Li Shimin's follower Yuchi Jingde arrived in time and defeated Shan Xiongxin.

After the Battle of Hulao, Wang Shichong surrendered to the Tang dynasty. Shan was captured by Li Shimin and was executed. Before the execution, his friend Xu Shiji, who surrendered to the Tang dynasty after the collapse of Wagang Army, tried to save him by persuading Li Shimin that Shan was one of the best warriors in the region who could be useful for Tang. However, Li Shimin had made his mind on killing Shan Xiongxin. Xu Shiji met Shan Xiongxin in the prison for the last time and cried. He cut off a piece of his flesh from the leg and asked Shan Xiongxin to swallow it, so that he could be always with Shan Xiongxin.

== In popular culture ==
Shan Xiongxin is one of the most important figures in folk tales about the Sui and Tang dynasties. In the legend, Xiongxin was said to be his courtesy name while his given name was Shan Tong. He was one of the top-tier warriors at that time and was known for his bravery and generous. His weapon was a lance with golden nails. He had an elder brother named Shan Xiongzhong, who was accidentally killed by Li Yuan, who later became the founding emperor of the Tang dynasty. Shan brothers were said to be gang heads in Hebei area with good reputations on helping poor people and punish bad officials. When Qin Shubao was in trouble, Shan Xiongxin tried his best to help Qin. Later, both Shan and Qin joined Wagang Army. After the Wagang failed, Qin Shubao submitted to the Tang dynasty. However, because the Tang emperor killed his brother, Shan refused to do so. He became a son-in-law of Wang Shichong. After battles at Luoyang, Shan Xiongxin was captured by Li Shimin. Li Shimin apologized his father's fault to Shan Xiongxin, hoping Shan would submit to Tang. However, Shan still refused to surrender. Li Shimin had to execute him.

In some versions of a legend, Yŏn Kaesomun, the general of Goguryeo, was said to be the next life of Shan Xiongxin. In the legend, he had at least one son called Shan Tianchang, who submitted to the Tang dynasty later, and was finally killed in a battle against Turkic Khaganate.

== Family ==
Ancestor:

- Shan Kuang: Local governor of Jiyin in the Han dynasty

Son:

- Shan Daozhen: Sima (vice governor) of Liangzhou in the Tang dynasty

Grandsons:

- Shan Sijing: Commander of the Protectorate to Pacify the East in the Tang dynasty
- Shan Sili
- Shan Siyuan: Governor of Qizhou in the Tang dynasty

Notable great-grandsons:

- Shan Youling: Teacher of the Crown Prince
- Shan Buxian
- Shan Guangye

After 11 generations:

- Brothers Shan Xing, Shan Wang, Shan Mao and Shan Sheng: Key members of Huang Chao's uprising
