= Manchu people =

East Asian ethnic group

Manchu
ᠮᠠᠨᠵᡠ · 满族
- Manchus dressed as royal family

Total population
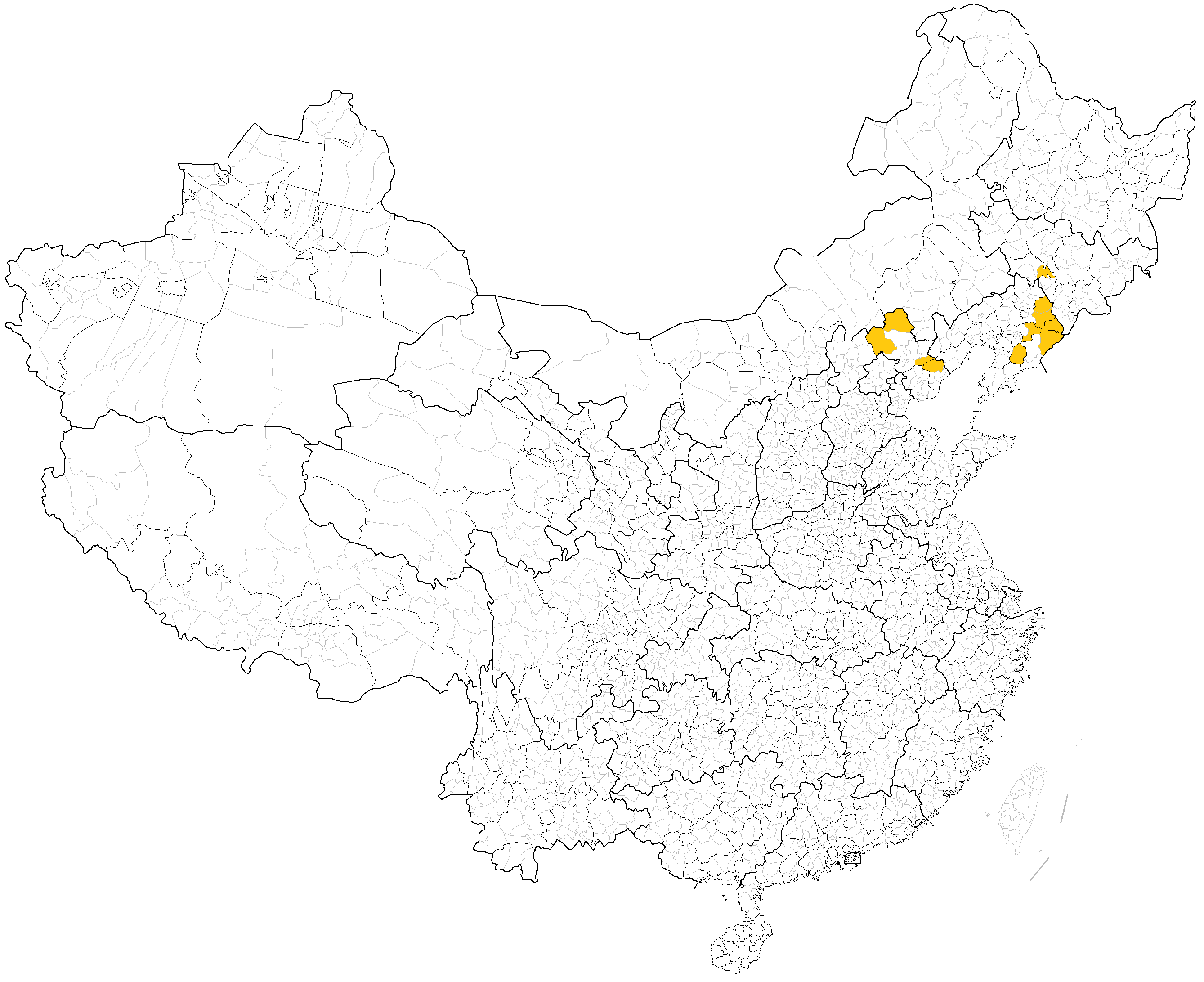
- 10,682,263 (Note: Modern China permits Han Chinese members of the Eight Banner System to register as Manchu, thus heavily inflating the modern population of Manchus.) Distribution of Manchu autonomous prefectures and counties in Mainland China

Regions with significant populations
- Mainland China: 10,423,303 (2020 census)
- Taiwan: 12,000 (2004 estimate)
- Hong Kong: 1,000 (1997 estimate)

Languages
- Manchu (native); Mandarin Chinese (dominant)

Religion
- Manchu shamanism, Buddhism, Chinese folk religion, Christianity

Related ethnic groups
- Tungusic peoples

Manchu people

Manchu name
- Manchu script: ᠮᠠᠨᠵᡠ
- Möllendorff: manju

Chinese name
- Traditional Chinese: 滿洲 / 滿族
- Simplified Chinese: 满洲 / 满族
Transcriptions
Standard Mandarin
- Hanyu Pinyin: Mǎnzhōu / Mǎnzú

The Manchus (Note: Also known as Man, Bannermen, or Banner people. They are sometimes called red-tasseled Manchus (Chinese: 红缨满洲; pinyin: Hóngyīng Mǎnzhōu), a reference to the ornamentation on traditional Manchu hats.) are a Tungusic East Asian ethnic group native to Manchuria in Northeast Asia. They are an officially recognized ethnic minority in China and the people from whom Manchuria derives its name. The Later Jin (1616–1636) and Qing (1636–1912) dynasties of China were established and ruled by the Manchus, who are descended from the Jurchen people who earlier established the Jin dynasty (1115–1234) in northern China.

The Manchus are the largest branch of the Tungusic peoples and are distributed throughout China, forming the country's fourth-largest ethnic group. They inhabit 31 Chinese provincial regions. Liaoning has the largest population and Hebei, Heilongjiang, Jilin, Inner Mongolia, and Beijing each have over 100,000 Manchu residents. About half of the population lives in Liaoning and one-fifth in Hebei. Manchu autonomous counties in China include Xinbin, Xiuyan, Qinglong, Fengning, Yitong, Qingyuan, Weichang, Kuancheng, Benxi, Kuandian, Huanren, Fengcheng, and Beizhen, (Note: Fengcheng and Beizhen are cities but treated as Manchu autonomous counties.) including over 300 Manchu towns and townships.

== Etymology ==
"Manchu" (Manchu: ᠮᠠᠨᠵᡠ, romanized: manju, Chinese: 滿洲) was adopted as the official name of the people by Emperor Hong Taiji in 1635, replacing the earlier name "Jurchen". Allegedly, manju was an old term for the Jianzhou Jurchens, although the etymology is not well understood. The Chinese characters chosen to translate the Manchu name are 滿洲 which, like the character for "Qing" (清), include the water radical. Possibly this was done because the Ming dynasty's name (明), which means "bright", represents fire, and water extinguishes fire.

The Jiu Manzhou Dang, archives of early 17th-century documents, contains the earliest use of Manchu. According to the Qing dynasty's official historical record, the Researches on Manchu Origins, the ethnic name came from Mañjuśrī. The Qianlong Emperor supported that point of view and wrote poems on the subject.

The same interpretation was held by Qing dynasty scholar Meng Sen, who also suggested that the name might stem from Li Manzhu (李滿住), the chieftain of the Jianzhou Jurchens.

Scholar Chang Shan theorized that Manju is a compound word, formed from man, from the word mangga (ᠮᠠᠩᡤᠠ), meaning "strong", and ju (ᠵᡠ), meaning "arrow". In this interpretation, Manju means "intrepid arrow".

Other hypotheses include Fu Sinian's "etymology of Jianzhou"; Zhang Binglin's "etymology of Manshi"; Ichimura Sanjiro's "etymology of Wuji and Mohe"; Sun Wenliang's "etymology of Manzhe"; "etymology of mangu(n) river" and so on.

An extensive etymological study from 2022 lends additional support to the view that manju is cognate with words referring to the lower Amur river in other Tungusic languages and can be reconstructed to Proto-Tungusic *mamgo 'lower Amur, large river'.

== History ==
=== Early history ===
==== Origin ====
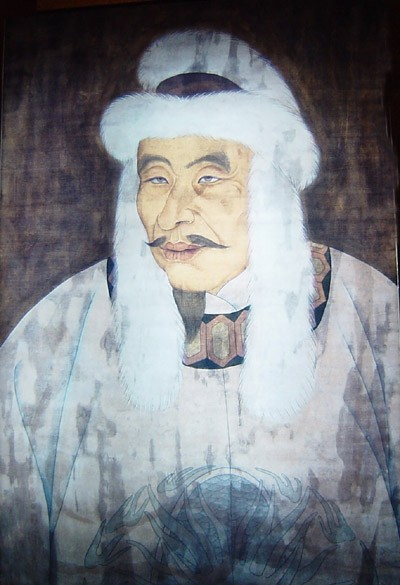
Aguda, Emperor Taizu of Jurchen Jin

The Manchus are descended from the Jurchen people who earlier established the Jin dynasty in China. However, this is disputed by historians. The Jianzhou Jurchen originated in part from the Huligai, who were classified by the Liao dynasty as a separate ethnicity from the Jurchen people who founded the Jin dynasty. The same was true during the Yuan dynasty.

The Huligai lived near the lower reaches of the Songhua River and Mudanjiang. Later, they moved west and became a major component of the Jianzhou Jurchens, led by Möngke Temür, during the Ming dynasty; the Jianzhou Jurchens later became the Manchus. According to the records of Ming Dynasty officials, the Jianzhou Jurchens were descended from Mohe people who established the Balhae Kingdom. The name Mohe might refer to an ancestral Manchu population. The Mohe practiced pig husbandry and were mainly sedentary. They used pig and dog skins for coats. They were predominantly farmers and grew soybeans, wheat, millet, and rice, in addition to hunting.

In the 10th century AD, the term Jurchen first appeared in late Tang dynasty documents, referring to the state of Balhae in present-day northeastern China. The Jurchens were sedentary, settled farmers with advanced agriculture. They farmed grain and millet as their cereal crops, grew flax, and raised oxen, pigs, sheep, and horses. These farmers lived differently from the pastoral nomadism of the Mongols and the Khitans on the steppes.

In April 1019, Jurchen pirates raided Japan to kidnap and enslave Northern Kyushu residents. They killed a total of 374 Japanese, including governor Fujiwara Noritada, slaughtered 380 Japanese-owned livestock, and abducted 1,280 Japanese. Goryeo forces later captured eight ships, allowing for the return of a number of captives (variously reported as either 259 or 270). The woman Uchikura no Ishime's report was copied. Jurchen raids on Japan in the 1019 Toi invasion, the Mongol invasions of Japan, and Japanese views of the Jurchens as "Tatar" "barbarians" (adopting China's barbarian-civilized binary), may have played a role in Japan's hostility to Manchus in later centuries. For example, Tokugawa Ieyasu viewed the unification of Manchu tribes as a threat to Japan. The Japanese mistakenly thought that Hokkaido (Ezochi) had a land bridge to Tartary (Orankai), where the Manchus lived, and that the Manchus could invade Japan. The Tokugawa shogunate bakufu sent a message to Korea via Tsushima, offering to help Korea against the 1627 Manchu invasion, but the offer was declined.

==== Liao dynasty ====
Following the fall of Balhae, the Jurchens became vassals of the Liao dynasty, which was founded by Para-Mongolic Khitans. The Liao dynasty became the first state to control all of Manchuria.. The Yalu River Jurchens became tributaries of Goryeo during the reign of Wang Geon, who called upon them during the wars of the Later Three Kingdoms period. The Jurchens switched allegiance between Liao and Goryeo multiple times. Posing a potential threat to Goryeo's border security, the Jurchens offered tribute to the Goryeo court, expecting gifts in return. Before the Jurchens overthrew the Khitan, married Jurchen women and Jurchen girls were raped by Liao Khitan envoys as a custom which caused resentment. The Jurchens and their Manchu descendants had Khitan linguistic and grammatical elements in their personal names, such as suffixes. Many Khitan names had a "ju" suffix. It is known that the Manchu clan Hitara from which Nurhaci's mother, Empress Xuan, originated was initially called Hitan, although exact facts regarding a genealogical connection between the Para-Mongolic Khitan and the Manchu Hitan clan are absent. In the year 1114, Wanyan Aguda united the Jurchen tribes and established the Jin dynasty (1115–1234). His brother and successor, Wanyan Wuqimai defeated the Liao. After the fall of the Liao, the Jurchens went to war with the Northern Song dynasty, and captured most of northern China in the Jin–Song wars. During the Jin dynasty in the 1120s, the first Jurchen script came into use. It was mainly derived from Khitan script.

==== Yuan dynasty ====
In 1206, the Mongols, then vassals of the Jurchens, revolted. Their resistance was led by Genghis Khan. The Jurchens were ultimately defeated by Ögedei Khan in 1234. Jurchen Jin emperor Wanyan Yongji's daughter Jurchen Princess Qiguo married Genghis Khan in exchange for relieving the Mongol siege upon Zhongdu (Beijing) in the Mongol conquest of the Jin dynasty. The Mongols then founded the Yuan dynasty. The Yuan grouped people into different categories based on how recently their state surrendered to the Yuan. Subjects of the southern Song were classified as southerners (nan ren) and also referred to as manzi. Subjects of the Jin dynasty, Western Xia, and the kingdom of Dali in Yunnan, southern China, were categorized as northerners, using the term Han. However, the use of the Han as the name of a class category by the Yuan dynasty was a different concept from Han ethnicity. To control the population of Manchuria, the Yuan Empire appointed its supporters from among the Koreans, Khitans, and Mongols as leaders of the Jurchens.

Ethnic Han people were divided into two classes in the Yuan, Han Ren and Nan Ren. Additionally, the Yuan directive to treat Jurchens the same as Mongols referred to Jurchens and Khitans in the northwest (not the Jurchen homeland in the northeast), presumably in the lands of Qara Khitai, where many Khitans lived. However, it remains a mystery how the Jurchens lived there. Many Jurchens adopted Mongolian customs, names, and the Mongolian language. As time went on, fewer and fewer Jurchens could recognize their own script. The Jurchen Yehe Nara clan is of paternal Mongol origin.

Many Jurchen families descended from the original Jin Jurchen migrants in Han areas, such as those using the surnames Wang and Nian 粘 reclaimed their ethnicity and registered as Manchus. Wanyan (完顏) clan members who changed their surnames to Wang (王) after the Mongol conquest of the Jin dynasty applied successfully to the national government for their ethnic group to be marked as Manchu despite never having been part of the Eight Banner system during the Qing dynasty. The surname Nianhan (粘罕), shortened to Nian (粘), is a surname of Jurchen origin, also originating from one of the members of the royal Wanyan clan. It is an extremely rare surname in China, and members of the Nian clan live in Nan'an, Quanzhou, Jinjiang, Shishi, Xiamen, Fuzhou, Zhangpu, and Sanming, Fujian, as well as in Laiyang, Shandong and in Xingtai, Hebei. Some of the Nian from Quanzhou immigrated to Taiwan, Singapore, and Malaysia. In Taiwan, they are concentrated in Changhua county. There are fewer than 30,000 members of the Nian clan worldwide, with 9,916 in Taiwan and 3,040 of those in Fuxing township of Changhua county.

==== Ming dynasty ====
建州毛憐則渤海大氏遺孽，樂住種，善緝紡，飲食服用，皆如華人，自長白山迤南，可拊而治也。 "The (people of) Chien-chou and Mao-lin [YLSL always reads Mao-lien] are the descendants of the family Ta of Po-hai. They love to be sedentary and sew, and they are skilled in spinning and weaving. As for food, clothing, and utensils, they are the same as those used by the Chinese. Those living south of the Ch'ang-pai mountain are apt to be soothed and governed."

— 魏焕《皇明九邊考》卷二《遼東鎮邊夷考》 Translation from Sino-Jürčed relations during the Yung-Lo period, 1403–1424 by Henry Serruys

The Ming dynasty replaced the Yuan dynasty in 1368. In 1387, Ming forces defeated the Mongol commander Naghachu's resisting forces who settled in the Haixi area and summoned the Jurchen tribes to pay tribute. At the time, Jurchen clans such as Odoli and Huligai were vassals to the Joseon dynasty of Korea. Their elites served in the Korean royal bodyguard.

The Joseon Koreans addressed the military threat posed by the Jurchen through forceful means, incentives, and military attacks. At the same time, they tried to appease them with titles and degrees, traded with them, and sought to acculturate them by having Jurchens integrate into Korean culture. The Ming government eventually ended this relationship due to their wishes for the Jurchens to defend the border. In 1403, Ahacu, chieftain of Huligai, paid tribute to the Yongle Emperor. Soon after, Möngke Temür, (Note: Möngke Temür, Qing dynasty emperors' ancestor), chieftain of the Odoli clan of the Jianzhou Jurchens, stopped paying tribute to Korea, instead becoming a tributary to China.

Yi Seong-gye, the Taejo of Joseon, asked the Ming Empire to send Möngke Temür back, but was refused. The Yongle Emperor was determined to move the Jurchens from Korean to Chinese influence. Korea unsuccessfully tried to persuade Möngke Temür to reject the Ming overtures, and he submitted to the Ming Empire. More and more Jurchen tribes began to offer tribute to the Ming Empire. The Ming divided them into 384 guards, and the Jurchen became vassals to the Ming Empire. During the Ming dynasty, the name for the Jurchen land was Nurgan. The Jurchens became part of the Ming dynasty's Nurgan Regional Military Commission under the Yongle Emperor, with Ming forces erecting the Yongning Temple Stele in 1413, at the headquarters of Nurgan. The stele was inscribed in Chinese, Jurchen, Mongolian, and Tibetan.

In 1449, Mongol Taishi Esen attacked the Ming Empire and captured the Zhengtong Emperor in Tumu. Some Jurchen guards in Jianzhou and Haixi cooperated with Esen, but more were attacked in the Mongol invasion. Many Jurchen chieftains lost their hereditary certificates granted by the Ming government. They were forced to present tribute as secretariats (中書舍人), receiving less reward from the Ming court than they did when they were heads of guards. This was an unpopular development. Subsequently, more and more Jurchens recognised the Ming Empire's declining power due to Esen's invasion. The Zhengtong Emperor's capture led to loosening control over the Jurchen guards. Tribal leaders, such as Cungšan (Note: Cungšan was considered as Nurhaci's direct ancestor by some viewpoints, but disagreements also exist.) and Wang Gao, plundered Ming territory. At about this time, the Jurchen script was officially abandoned. More Jurchens adopted Mongolian as their writing language and fewer used Chinese. The final recorded Jurchen writing dates to 1526.

==== Lifestyle ====
The Manchus are sometimes mistakenly classified as nomadic people. On the contrary, Manchu society was agricultural, involving crop farming and animal husbandry. Manchus practiced slash-and-burn agriculture in the areas north of Shenyang. The Haixi Jurchens were semi-agricultural, the Jianzhou Jurchens and Maolian (毛憐) Jurchens were sedentary, while hunting and fishing was the way of life of the "Wild Jurchens". Han Chinese society resembled that of the sedentary farmers Jianzhou and Maolian. Hunting, archery on horseback, horsemanship, livestock raising, and agriculture were all part of Jianzhou Jurchens culture. Although Manchus practiced equestrianism and archery on horseback, their immediate progenitors practiced sedentary agriculture. Manchus also partook in hunting. They lived in villages, forts, and walled towns.

Only the Mongols and the northern Wild Jurchen were semi-nomadic. The rest gathered ginseng root, pine nuts, hunted for game pelts in the uplands and forests, raised horses in stables, and farmed millet and wheat in their fallow fields. They engaged in dances, wrestling, and drinking strong liquor.

These Jurchens, who lived in the northeast's harsh cold climate, sometimes half-sunk their houses in the ground, which they constructed of brick or timber. They surrounded their fortified villages with stone foundations on which they built wattle-and-mud wall fortifications. Village clusters were ruled by beile, hereditary leaders. They fought each other and dispensed weapons, wives, enslaved people, and lands to their followers.

Jurchens like Nurhaci spoke both their native Tungusic language and Chinese, adopting the Mongol script for their own language, unlike the Jin Jurchens, who used a Khitan-derived script. They adopted Confucian values and shamanic traditions.

Unlike their Mohe ancestors, the Jurchens began to respect dogs around the time of the Ming dynasty, and passed this tradition on to the Manchus. It was prohibited in Jurchen culture to use dog skin, and forbidden for Jurchens to harm, kill, or eat dogs.

For political reasons, the Jurchen leader Nurhaci chose to emphasize either differences or similarities in lifestyles with other peoples, such as the Mongols. Nurhaci said to the Mongols that "the languages of the Chinese and Koreans are different, but their clothing and way of life is the same. It is the same with us Manchus (Jušen) and Mongols. Our languages are different, but our clothing and way of life is the same." Later, Nurhaci indicated that the bond with the Mongols was not based on shared culture. It was for pragmatic reasons of "mutual opportunism," since Nurhaci said to the Mongols: "You Mongols raise livestock, eat meat, and wear pelts. My people till the fields and live on grain. We two are not one country and we have different languages." Nurhaci, a chieftain of the Jianzhou Left Guard who officially considered himself a local representative of imperial power of the Ming dynasty, made efforts to unify the Jurchen tribes and established a military system called the "Eight Banners", which organized Jurchen soldiers into groups of "Bannermen", and ordered his scholar Erdeni and minister Gagai to create a new Jurchen script (later known as Manchu script) using the traditional Mongolian alphabet as a reference.

=== Manchu rule over China ===
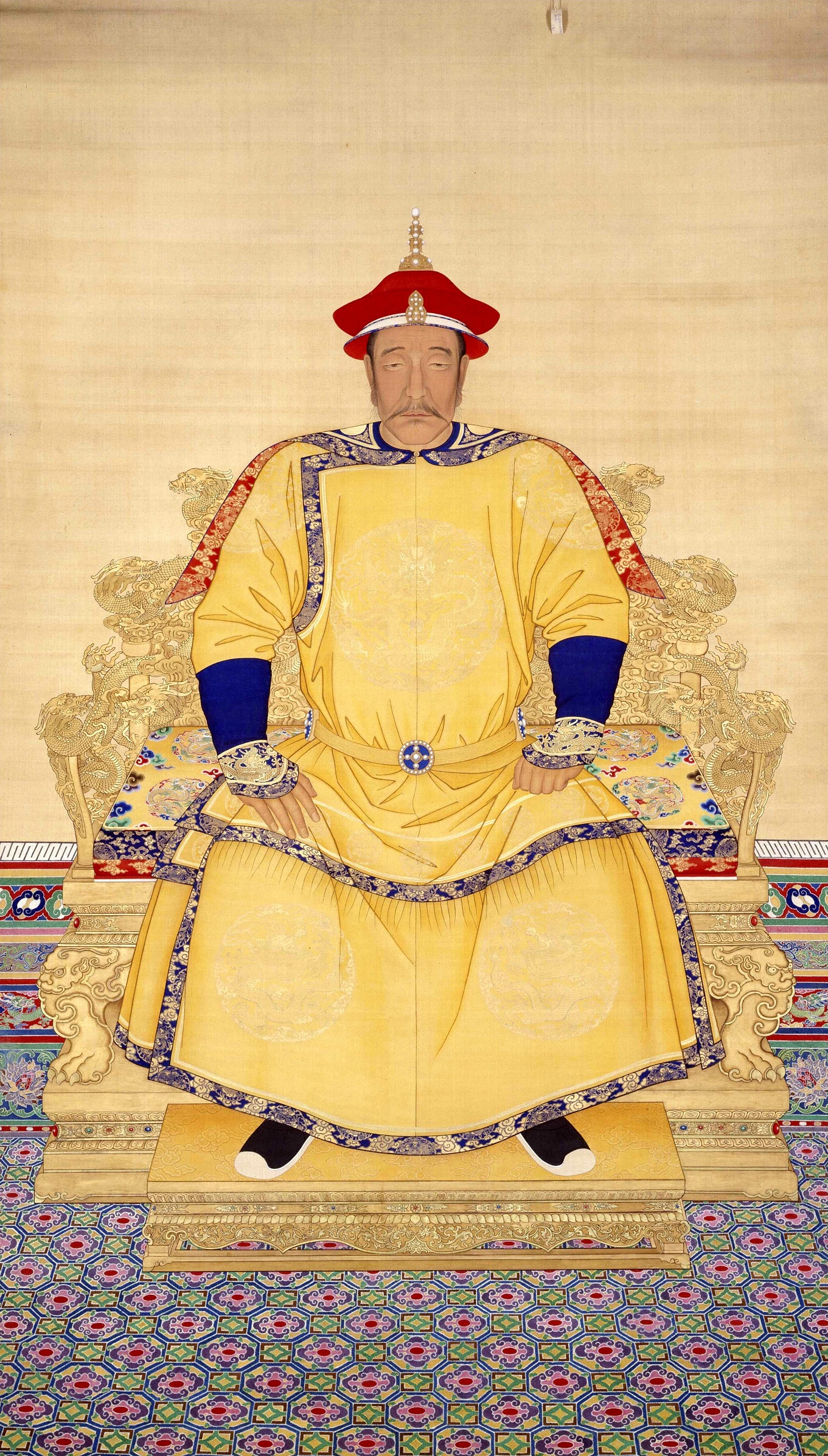
An imperial portrait of Nurhaci

When Nurhaci reorganized the Jurchens into the Eight Banners, many Manchu clans were artificially created from unrelated people, who founded a new Manchu clan (mukun) using a geographic origin name, such as a toponym, as their hala (clan name). The irregularities over Jurchen and Manchu clan origin led the Qing to try to systematize the creation of historical documents for Manchu clans, including manufacturing a legend around the origin of the Aisin-Gioro clan using mythology from the northeast.

In 1603, Nurhaci gained recognition as the Sure Kundulen Khan (Manchu: ᠰᡠᡵᡝ
ᡴᡠᠨᡩᡠᠯᡝᠨ
ᡥᠠᠨ, Möllendorff: sure kundulen han, Abkai: sure kundulen han, "wise and respected khan") from his Khalkha Mongol allies; then, in 1616, he enthroned himself and issued a proclamation naming himself Genggiyen Khan (Manchu: ᡤᡝᠩᡤᡳᠶᡝᠨ
ᡥᠠᠨ, Möllendorff: genggiyen han, Abkai: genggiyen han, "bright khan") of the Later Jin dynasty (Manchu: ᠠᡳᠰᡳᠨ
ᡤᡠᡵᡠᠨ, Möllendorff: aisin gurun, Abkai: aisin gurun, 後金). (Note: Aka. Manchu State (Manchu: ᠮᠠᠨᠵᡠ ᡤᡠᡵᡠᠨ, Möllendorff: manju gurun, Abkai: manju gurun)) Nurhaci then renounced the Ming overlordship with the Seven Grievances and launched his attack on the Ming dynasty and moved the capital to Mukden after his conquest of Liaodong. In 1635, his son and successor Hong Taiji changed the name of the Jurchen ethnic group (Manchu: ᠵᡠᡧᡝᠨ, Möllendorff: jušen, Abkai: juxen) to the Manchu. A year later, Hong Taiji proclaimed himself the emperor of the Qing dynasty (Manchu: ᡩᠠᡳᠴᡳᠩ
ᡤᡠᡵᡠᠨ, Möllendorff: daicing gurun, Abkai: daiqing gurun (Note: The meaning of "daicing" (daiqing) is debatable. It has been reported that the word was imported from Mongolian means "fighting country")). Factors for the name change from Jurchen to Manchu include the fact that the term "Jurchen" had negative connotations since the Jurchens had been in a servile position vis a vis the Ming dynasty for hundreds of years, and it also referred to people of the "dependent class". The change was made to hide the fact that the ancestors of the Manchus, the Jianzhou Jurchens, had been ruled by the Chinese. The Qing dynasty carefully hid the two original editions of the books of "Qing Taizu Wu Huangdi Shilu" and the "Manzhou Shilu Tu" (Taizu Shilu Tu) in the Qing palace, forbidden from public view because they showed that the Ming dynasty had ruled the Manchu Aisin-Gioro family. In the Ming period, the Koreans of Joseon referred to the Jurchen inhabited lands north of the Korean peninsula, above the rivers Yalu and Tumen to be part of Ming China, as the "superior country" (sangguk) that they called Ming China. The Qing deliberately excluded references and information that showed the Jurchens (Manchus) as subservient to the Ming dynasty, from the History of Ming to hide their former subservient relationship to the Ming. Because of this, the Ming Veritable Records were not used as a source for content on the Jurchens during Ming rule in the History of Ming.

Hong Taiji created an effective political system for that time based on Han Chinese management methods, which lasted until the fall of the Qing Empire in the 20th century. In this sense, Hong Taiji is considered by historians as the true first emperor for the Qing dynasty. In 1636, Hong Taiji invaded Joseon Korea, as the latter did not accept that Hong Taiji had become emperor and refused to assist in operations against the Ming Dynasty, which still ruled much of China. When the Joseon dynasty surrendered in 1637, Hong Taiji succeeded in making them cut off relations with the Ming dynasty and force them to submit as a tributary state to the Qing dynasty. Also during this period, Hong Taiji took over Inner Mongolia, which had up until that point protected the northern border with China, in three wars, each of them victorious. From 1636 until 1644, he sent four major expeditions into the Amur region. In 1640 he completed the conquest of the Evenks, when he defeated and captured their leader Bombogor. By 1644, the entire region was under his control.

In 1644, the Ming capital, Beijing, was sacked by a peasant revolt led by Li Zicheng, a former minor Ming official who became the leader of the peasant revolt, who then proclaimed the establishment of the Shun dynasty. The last Ming ruler, the Chongzhen Emperor, died by suicide by hanging himself when the city fell. When Li Zicheng moved against Ming general Wu Sangui, the latter allied with the Manchus and opened the Shanhai Pass to the Manchu army. After the Manchus defeated Li Zicheng, they established their capital in Beijing (Manchu: ᠪᡝᡤᡳᠩ, Möllendorff: beging, Abkai: beging) in the same year.

The Qing government distinguished between Han Bannermen and ordinary Han civilians. Han Bannermen were Han Chinese who defected to the Qing Empire before 1644 and joined the Eight Banners, thereby gaining social and legal privileges and acculturating to Manchu culture. So many Han defected to the Qing Empire that the ranks of the Eight Banners swelled, and ethnic Manchus became a minority within the Banners, making up only 16% in 1648, with Han Bannermen dominating at 75% and Mongol Bannermen making up the rest. It was this multi-ethnic, majority Han force in which Manchus were a minority that conquered China for the Qing Empire.

In 1632, to balance the massive number of Han women who entered the Manchu court, as well as to promote harmony between the two groups, Prince Yoto and Hong Taiji organized a mass marriage of Han Chinese officers and officials to Manchu women. To further promote ethnic harmony, a 1648 decree from the Shunzhi Emperor allowed Han Chinese civilian men to marry Manchu women from the Banners with the permission of the Board of Revenue (if they were registered daughters of officials or commoners) or the permission of their banner company captain (if they were unregistered commoners). Later in the dynasty these policies allowing intermarriage were done away with.

The Qing Empire ca. 1820

As a result of their conquest of Ming China, almost all the Manchus followed the prince regent Dorgon and the Shunzhi Emperor to Beijing and settled there. A few were sent to other places such as Inner Mongolia, Xinjiang, and Tibet to serve as garrison troops. 1,524 bannermen were in Manchuria at the time of the initial Manchu conquest. After a series of border conflicts with the Russians, the Qing emperors began to relocate Manchus to Manchuria, realizing its strategic importance. Throughout the Qing dynasty, Beijing was the center of the political, economic, and cultural spheres. As the Yongzheng Emperor noted, "Garrisons are the places of stationed works, Beijing is their homeland."

While the Manchu ruling elite increasingly adopted Han culture, the Qing imperial government recognized the importance of Manchu communities in Manchuria: both for the preservation of traditional Manchu values and for the stockpiling of military power to support the regime. The Qing emperors tried to protect the traditional way of life of the Manchus (as well as other tribal peoples) in central and northern Manchuria through a variety of means. Mainly, they restricted the migration of Han settlers to the region. This had to be balanced with practical needs, such as maintaining the defense of northern China against the Russians and the Mongols, supplying government farms with a skilled work force, and conducting trades—all of which still resulted in a continuous trickle of Han convicts, workers, and merchants to the northeast.

Han Chinese transfrontiersmen and other non-Jurchen origin people who joined the Later Jin early were put into the Manchu Banners instead of the Han Banners. They were known as baisin in Manchu. An example was the Tokoro Manchu clan in the Manchu banners, which claimed to be descended from a Han Chinese with the surname of Tao who had moved north from Zhejiang to Liaodong and joined the Jurchens before the Qing in the Ming Wanli emperor's era. The Han Chinese Banner Tong 佟 clan of Fushun in Liaoning falsely claimed to be related to the Jurchen Manchu Tunggiya 佟佳 clan of Jilin, attempting to get transferred to a Manchu banner in the reign of the Kangxi Emperor.

Select groups of Han Chinese bannermen were mass transferred into Manchu Banners by the Qing, changing their recorded ethnicity from Han Chinese to Manchu. Han Chinese bannermen of Tai Nikan (台尼堪, watchpost Chinese) and Fusi Nikan (撫順尼堪, Fushun Chinese) backgrounds transferred into the Manchu banners in 1740 by order of the Qianlong Emperor. Between 1618 and 1629, the Han Chinese from Liaodong who later became the Fushun Nikan and Tai Nikan defected to the Manchus. These clans continued to use their Han surnames and were marked as of Han origin on Qing lists of Manchu clans. The Fushun Nikan became Manjurified and the originally Han banner families of Wang Shixuan, Cai Yurong, Zu Dashou, Li Yongfang, Shi Tingzhu and Shang Kexi intermarried extensively with Manchu families.

A Manchu Bannerman in Guangzhou called Hequan illegally adopted a Han Chinese named Zhao Tinglu, the son of former Han bannerman Zhao Quan, and named him Quanheng so that he could benefit from his adopted son receiving a salary as a Banner soldier.

Commoner Manchu bannermen who were not nobility were called irgen, which meant common, in contrast to the Manchu nobility of the Eight Great Houses who held noble titles.

Manchu bannermen of the capital garrison in Beijing were said to be the worst militarily, unable to draw bows, unable to ride horses, and fight properly, and abandoning their Manchu culture.

Manchu bannermen from the Xi'an banner garrison were praised for maintaining Manchu culture by Kangxi in 1703. Xi'an garrison Manchus were said to retain Manchu culture far better than other Manchus at martial skills in the provincial garrisons, and they were able to draw their bows properly and perform cavalry archery, unlike Beijing Manchus. The Qianlong emperor received a memorial saying Xi'an Manchu bannermen still had martial skills, although not up to those in the past, in a 1737 memorial from Cimbu. By the 1780s, the military skills of Xi'an Manchu bannermen had dropped although they were regarded as the most militarily skilled provincial Manchu banner garrison. Manchu women from the Xi'an garrison often left the walled Manchu garrison. They went to hot springs outside the city and gained a bad reputation for their sexual behavior. A Manchu from Beijing, Sumurji, was shocked and disgusted by this after he was appointed Lieutenant General of the Manchu garrison of Xi'an and informed the Yongzheng Emperor. Han civilians and Manchu bannermen in Xi'an had bad relations, with the bannermen trying to steal at the markets. Manchu Lieutenant General Cimbru reported this to the Yongzheng Emperor in 1729. Governor Yue Rui of Shandong was then ordered by the Yongzheng to report any bannerman misbehavior and warned him not to cover it up in 1730 after Manchu bannermen were put in a quarter in Qingzhou. Manchu bannermen from the garrisons in Xi'an and Jingzhou fought in Xinjiang in the 1770s. Manchus from the Xi'an garrison fought in other campaigns against the Dzungars and Uyghurs throughout the 1690s and 18th century. In the 1720s, Jingzhou, Hangzhou, and Nanjing Manchu banner garrisons fought in Tibet.

For over 200 years, Han civilians and Manchu bannermen in Xi'an lived next to each other, but did not intermarry. Sociologist Edward Alsworth Ross wrote of his visit to Xi'an just before the Xinhai revolution:

In Sianfu the Tartar quarter is a dismal picture of crumbling walls, decay, indolence and squalor. On the big drill grounds you see the runways along which the horseman gallops and shoots arrows at a target while the Tartar military mandarins look on. These lazy bannermen were tried in the new army but proved flabby and good-for-nothing; they would break down on an ordinary twenty-mile march. Battening on their hereditary pensions they have given themselves up to sloth and vice, and their poor chest development, small weak muscles, and diminishing families foreshadow the early dying out of the stock. Where is there a better illustration of the truth that parasitism leads to degeneration!

— Edward Alsworth Ross

Ross spoke highly of the Han and Hui population of Xi'an, Shaanxi and Gansu, saying: "After a fortnight of mule litter we sight ancient yellow Sianfu, "the Western capital," with its third of a million souls. Within the fortified triple gate the facial mold abruptly changes and the refined intellectual type appears. Here and there faces of a Hellenic purity of feature are seen and beautiful children are not uncommon. These Chinese cities make one realize how the cream of the population gathers in the urban centers. Everywhere town opportunities have been a magnet for the élite of the open country."

The Qing dynasty altered its law on intermarriage between Han civilians and Manchu bannermen several times. Initially, the Qing allowed Han civilians to marry Manchu women. Then the Qing banned civilians from marrying women from the Eight Banners. In 1865, the Qing allowed Han civilian men to marry Manchu bannerwomen in all garrisons except the capital garrison of Beijing. No formal law limited marriage between people of different banners, but it was informally regulated by social status and custom. In northeastern China, including Heilongjiang and Liaoning, it was more common for Manchu women to marry Han men, since they were not subject to the same laws and institutional oversight as Manchus and Han elsewhere, including Beijing.

In the 1850s, large numbers of Manchu bannermen were sent to central China to fight the Taiping rebels. (For example, just the Heilongjiang province – which at the time included only the northern part of today's Heilongjiang – contributed 67,730 bannermen to the campaign, of whom only 10–20% survived). Those few who returned were demoralized and often ended up in opium addiction. In 1860, in the aftermath of the loss of Outer Manchuria, and with the imperial and provincial governments in deep financial trouble, parts of Manchuria became officially open to Chinese settlement; within a few decades, the Manchus became a minority in most Manchuria districts.

=== Modern times ===
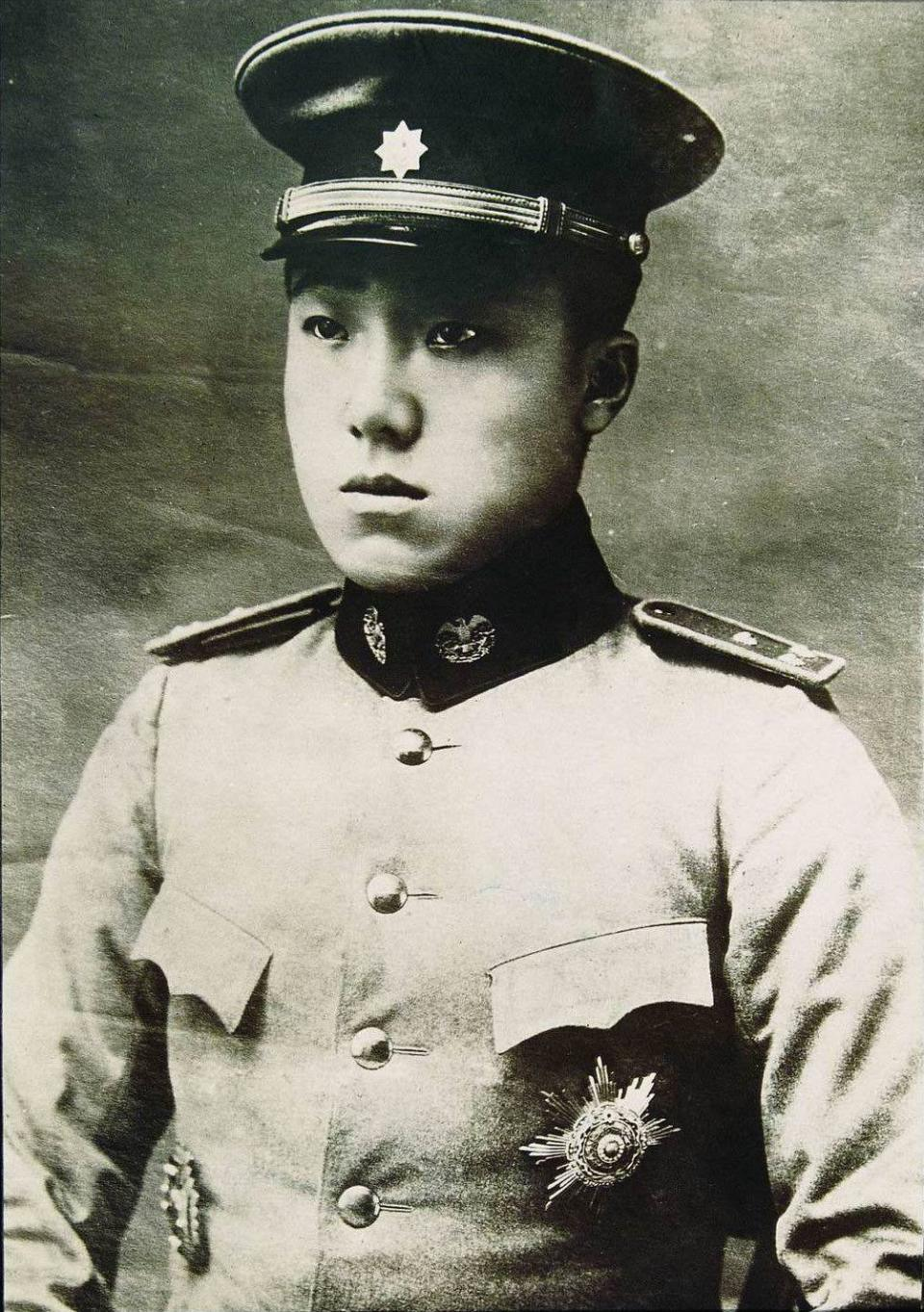
Prince Zaitao dresses in modern reformed uniform of late Qing dynasty

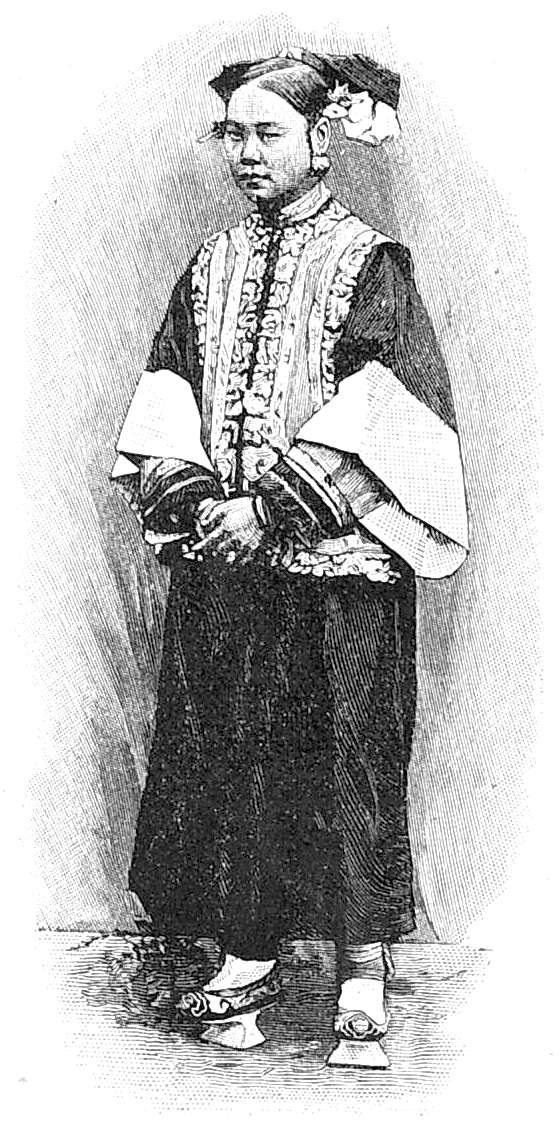
Manchu woman, 1896

The majority of people living in inner Beijing during the Qing were Manchus and Mongol bannermen from the Eight Banners after they were moved there in 1644, since Han Chinese were expelled and not allowed to re-enter the inner part of the city. Only after the "Hundred Days' Reform", during the reign of the Guangxu Emperor, were Han allowed to enter inner Beijing.

Many Manchu Bannermen in Beijing supported the Boxers in the Boxer Rebellion and shared their anti-foreign sentiment. The Manchu Bannermen were devastated by the fighting during the First Sino-Japanese War. They conducted much of the fighting in the Boxer Rebellion, sustaining massive casualties followed by hardship. German Minister Clemens von Ketteler was assassinated by a Manchu. Thousands of Manchus fled south from Aigun during the Boxer Rebellion, their cattle and horses stolen by Russian Cossacks who razed their villages and homes. The Manchu clan system in Aigun was obliterated by the invaders.

By the 19th century, most Manchus in the city garrison spoke only Mandarin, and not Manchu, which distinguished them from their Han neighbors in southern China, who spoke other dialects. The Manchus' use of Beijing dialects made it relatively easy to recognize them. The Manchu Bannermen spoke northern Standard Chinese, instead of the local dialect. Manchus in the garrisons at Jingzhou and Guangzhou spoke Beijing Mandarin even though Cantonese was Guangzhou's common language. Their Beijing dialect distinguished bannermen at the Xi'an garrison from locals who spoke the Xi'an dialect. Bannermen took jobs as teachers, writing textbooks for learning Mandarin and instructing people in Mandarin. In Guangdong, Manchu Mandarin teacher Sun Yizun advised that the Yinyun Chanwei and Kangxi Zidian, dictionaries issued by the Qing government, were the correct guides to Mandarin pronunciation, rather than the pronunciation of the Beijing and Nanjing dialects.

In the late 19th and early 20th centuries, intermarriage between Manchus and Han bannermen in the northeast increased as Manchu families were more willing to marry their daughters to sons from well off Han families to trade their ethnic status for financial status. Most intermarriage consisted of Han Bannermen marrying Manchus in areas like Aihun.

As the end of the Qing dynasty approached, Manchus were portrayed as outside colonizers by Chinese nationalists such as Sun Yat-sen, even though many reform-minded Manchu officials and military officers supported the Republican revolution he brought about. This portrayal dissipated somewhat after the 1911 revolution as the new Republic of China now sought to include Manchus within its national identity. However, the revolution still saw many massacres committed by revolutionaries against the Manchus, most notably in Jiading, Xi'an, and Yangzhou, resulting in at least 12,000 known deaths in these three cities alone. The revolution drastically sped up the political/economic decline of the Manchu population. To blend in, some Manchus switched to speaking the local dialect instead of Standard Chinese.

First flag used by Republican China. The yellow stripe symbolizes Manchus.

By the early years of the Republic of China, very few areas of China still had traditional Manchu populations. Among the few regions hosting such relatively traditional communities, and where the Manchu language was still widely spoken, were the Aigun (Manchu: ᠠᡳᡥᡡᠨ, Möllendorff: aihūn, Abkai: aihvn) District and the Qiqihar (Manchu: ᠴᡳᠴᡳᡤᠠᡵ, Möllendorff: cicigar, Abkai: qiqigar) District of Heilongjiang Province.

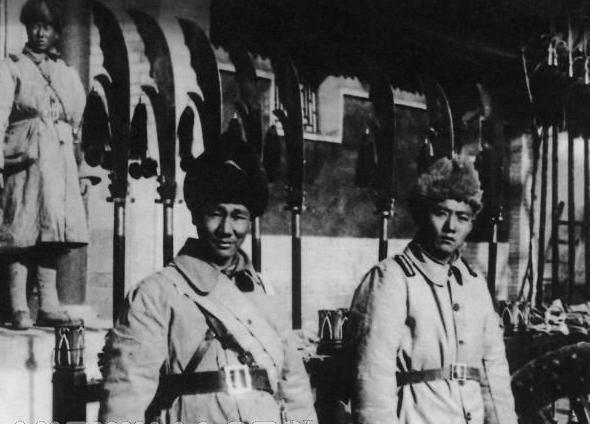
Fengtian clique soldiers in the 1920s

Until 1924, the Chinese government continued to pay stipends to Manchu bannermen, but many cut ties with their banners and adopted Han-style names to avoid persecution. The official total of Manchus fell by more than half during this period, as they obscured their ethnicity when asked. Exceptionally, in warlord Zhang Zuolin's reign in Manchuria, much better treatment was reported, with no particular persecution of Manchus. Qing emperor mausoleums were still allowed to be managed by Manchu guardsmen, as in the past. Many Manchus joined the Fengtian clique, such as Xi Qia, a member of the Qing dynasty's imperial clan.

==== Manchukuo ====
As a follow-up to the Mukden Incident, Manchukuo, a puppet state in Manchuria, was created by the Empire of Japan in 1932, which the deposed Last Emperor Puyi nominally ruled. Although the nation's name implied a Manchu affiliation, it was actually a new country incorporating all the ethnicities in Manchuria. It had a majority Han population and was opposed by many Manchus as well as people of other ethnicities who fought against Japan in the Second Sino-Japanese War.

Japanese Ueda Kyōsuke labeled all 30 million residents in Manchuria "Manchus", including Han Chinese. The Japanese-authored "Great Manchukuo" built upon Ueda's claim that all 30 million "Manchus" in Manchukuo had the right to independence, thereby justifying Manchukuo's secession from China. In 1942, the Japanese-authored Ten Year History of the Construction of Manchukuo emphasized the right of ethnic Japanese to the land of Manchukuo while attempting to delegitimize the Manchus' claim to Manchukuo as their native land, noting that most Manchus moved out during the Qing dynasty and returned only later.

==== People's Republic of China ====
In 1952, after the failure of both Manchukuo and the Nationalist government (KMT), the newborn People's Republic of China officially recognized the Manchu as one of the ethnic minorities as Mao Zedong had criticized the Han chauvinism that dominated the KMT. In the 1953 census, 2.5 million people identified themselves as Manchu. The Communist government also attempted to improve the treatment of Manchu people; some Manchu people who had hidden their ancestry during the period of KMT rule became willing to reveal it, such as the writer Lao She, who began to include Manchu characters in his fictional works in the 1950s. Between 1982 and 1990, the official count of Manchu people more than doubled from 4,299,159 to 9,821,180, making them China's fastest-growing ethnic minority, but this growth was due to people formerly registered as Han applying for official recognition as Manchu. Since the 1980s, thirteen Manchu autonomous counties have been created in Liaoning, Jilin, Hebei, and Heilongjiang.

The Eight Banners system is one of the most important ethnic identity of today's Manchu people. Manchus became more like an ethnic coalition which contains the descendants of Manchu bannermen and a large number of Manchu-assimilated Chinese and Mongol bannermen. However, Solon and Sibe Bannermen, who were considered as part of Eight Banner system under the Qing dynasty, were registered as independent ethnic groups by the PRC government as Daur, Evenk, Nanai, Oroqen, and Sibe.

Since the 1980s, after the Cultural Revolution, Manchu culture and language experienced a renaissance, including among Han Chinese. Manchu culture and language preservation is promoted by the Chinese Communist Party, and Manchus again became one of China's most socioeconomically advanced minorities. Manchus generally face little to no discrimination in their daily lives, except among Han nationalist conspiracy theorists, whom claim that Manchu elites occupy the CCP and, therefore, Manchus receive better treatment under the People's Republic of China.

Manchus were subjected to the same one-child policy and rules as the Han people. All Manchus, Koreans, Russians, Hui, and Mongols living in Inner Mongolia were subjected to restrictions on two children.

== Population ==
=== Mainland China ===
Most Manchu people now live in Mainland China, with a population of 10,423,303, which is 8.19% of the ethnic minority population and 0.74% of China's total population. However, the modern population of Manchus has been artificially inflated very much, because Han Chinese of the Eight Banner System, including booi bondservants, are allowed to register as Manchu in modern China. Among the provincial regions, there are two provinces, Liaoning and Hebei, which have over 1,000,000 Manchu residents. Liaoning has 5,336,895 Manchu residents, which is 51.26% of the Manchu population and 12.20% provincial population; Hebei has 2,118,711 Manchu residents, which is 20.35% of the Manchu population and 70.80% of the provincial ethnic minorities. Manchus are the largest ethnic minority in Liaoning, Hebei, Heilongjiang, and Beijing; 2nd largest in Jilin, Inner Mongolia, Tianjin, Ningxia, Shaanxi, and Shanxi and 3rd largest in Henan, Shandong, and Anhui.

==== Distribution ====
Rank	Region	Total Population	Manchu	Percentage in Manchu Population	Percentage in the Population of Ethnic Minorities (%)	Regional Percentage of Population	Regional Rank of Ethnic Population
	Total	1,335,110,869	10,410,585	100	9.28	0.77	
	Total (in all 31 provincial regions)	1,332,810,869	10,387,958	99.83	9.28	0.78	
G1	Northeast	109,513,129	6,951,280	66.77	68.13	6.35	
G2	North	164,823,663	3,002,873	28.84	32.38	1.82	
G3	East	392,862,229	122,861	1.18	3.11	0.03	
G4	South Central	375,984,133	120,424	1.16	0.39	0.03	
G5	Northwest	96,646,530	82,135	0.79	0.40	0.08	
G6	Southwest	192,981,185	57,785	0.56	0.15	0.03	
1	Liaoning	43,746,323	5,336,895	51.26	80.34	12.20	2nd
2	Hebei	71,854,210	2,118,711	20.35	70.80	2.95	2nd
3	Jilin	27,452,815	866,365	8.32	39.64	3.16	3rd
4	Heilongjiang	38,313,991	748,020	7.19	54.41	1.95	2nd
5	Inner Mongolia	24,706,291	452,765	4.35	8.96	2.14	3rd
6	Beijing	19,612,368	336,032	3.23	41.94	1.71	2nd
7	Tianjin	12,938,693	83,624	0.80	25.23	0.65	3rd
8	Henan	94,029,939	55,493	0.53	4.95	0.06	4th
9	Shandong	95,792,719	46,521	0.45	6.41	0.05	4th
10	Guangdong	104,320,459	29,557	0.28	1.43	0.03	9th
11	Shanghai	23,019,196	25,165	0.24	9.11	0.11	5th
12	Ningxia	6,301,350	24,902	0.24	1.12	0.40	3rd
13	Guizhou	34,748,556	23,086	0.22	0.19	0.07	18th
14	Xinjiang	21,815,815	18,707	0.18	0.14	0.09	10th
15	Jiangsu	78,660,941	18,074	0.17	4.70	0.02	7th
16	Shaanxi	37,327,379	16,291	0.16	8.59	0.04	3rd
17	Sichuan	80,417,528	15,920	0.15	0.32	0.02	10th
18	Gansu	25,575,263	14,206	0.14	0.59	0.06	7th
19	Yunnan	45,966,766	13,490	0.13	0.09	0.03	24th
20	Hubei	57,237,727	12,899	0.12	0.52	0.02	6th
21	Shanxi	25,712,101	11,741	0.11	12.54	0.05	3rd
22	Zhejiang	54,426,891	11,271	0.11	0.93	0.02	13th
23	Guangxi	46,023,761	11,159	0.11	0.07	0.02	12th
24	Anhui	59,500,468	8,516	0.08	2.15	0.01	4th
25	Fujian	36,894,217	8,372	0.08	1.05	0.02	10th
26	Qinghai	5,626,723	8,029	0.08	0.30	0.14	7th
27	Hunan	65,700,762	7,566	0.07	0.12	0.01	9th
28	Jiangxi	44,567,797	4,942	0.05	2.95	0.01	6th
29	Chongqing	28,846,170	4,571	0.04	0.24	0.02	7th
30	Hainan	8,671,485	3,750	0.04	0.26	0.04	8th
31	Tibet	3,002,165	718	<0.01	0.03	0.02	11th
	Active Servicemen	2,300,000	22,627	0.24	23.46	1.05	2nd

==== Manchu autonomous regions ====
Manchu Autonomous County	Province	City
Qinglong Manchu Autonomous County	Hebei	Qinhuangdao
Fengning Manchu Autonomous County	Hebei	Chengde
Weichang Manchu and Mongol Autonomous County	Hebei	Chengde
Kuancheng Manchu Autonomous County	Hebei	Chengde
Xiuyan Manchu Autonomous County	Liaoning	Anshan
Qingyuan Manchu Autonomous County	Liaoning	Fushun
Xinbin Manchu Autonomous County	Liaoning	Fushun
Kuandian Manchu Autonomous County	Liaoning	Dandong
Benxi Manchu Autonomous County	Liaoning	Benxi
Huanren Manchu Autonomous County	Liaoning	Benxi
Yitong Manchu Autonomous County	Jilin	Siping

Manchu Ethnic Town/Township	Province Autonomous area Municipality	City Prefecture	County
Paifang Hui and Manchu Ethnic Township	Anhui	Hefei	Feidong
Labagoumen Manchu Ethnic Township	Beijing	N/A	Huairou
Changshaoying Manchu Ethnic Township	Beijing	N/A	Huairou
Huangni Yi, Miao and Manchu Ethnic Township	Guizhou	Bijie	Dafang
Jinpo Miao, Yi and Manchu Ethnic Township	Guizhou	Bijie	Qianxi
Anluo Miao, Yi and Manchu Ethnic Township	Guizhou	Bijie	Jinsha
Xinhua Miao, Yi and Manchu Ethnic Township	Guizhou	Bijie	Jinsha
Tangquan Manchu Ethnic Township	Hebei	Tangshan	Zunhua
Xixiaying Manchu Ethnic Township	Hebei	Tangshan	Zunhua
Dongling Manchu Ethnic Township	Hebei	Tangshan	Zunhua
Lingyunce Manchu and Hui Ethnic Township	Hebei	Baoding	Yi
Loucun Manchu Ethnic Township	Hebei	Baoding	Laishui
Daweihe Hui and Manchu Ethnic Township	Hebei	Langfang	Wen'an
Pingfang Manchu Ethnic Township	Hebei	Chengde	Luanping
Anchungou Manchu Ethnic Township	Hebei	Chengde	Luanping
Wudaoyingzi Manchu Ethnic Township	Hebei	Chengde	Luanping
Zhengchang Manchu Ethnic Township	Hebei	Chengde	Luanping
Mayingzi Manchu Ethnic Township	Hebei	Chengde	Luanping
Fujiadianzi Manchu Ethnic Township	Hebei	Chengde	Luanping
Xidi Manchu Ethnic Township	Hebei	Chengde	Luanping
Xiaoying Manchu Ethnic Township	Hebei	Chengde	Luanping
Datun Manchu Ethnic Township	Hebei	Chengde	Luanping
Xigou Manchu Ethnic Township	Hebei	Chengde	Luanping
Gangzi Manchu Ethnic Township	Hebei	Chengde	Chengde
Liangjia Manchu Ethnic Township	Hebei	Chengde	Chengde
Bagualing Manchu Ethnic Township	Hebei	Chengde	Xinglong
Nantianmen Manchu Ethnic Township	Hebei	Chengde	Xinglong
Yinjiaying Manchu Ethnic Township	Hebei	Chengde	Longhua
Miaozigou Mongol and Manchu Ethnic Township	Hebei	Chengde	Longhua
Badaying Manchu Ethnic Township	Hebei	Chengde	Longhua
Taipingzhuang Manchu Ethnic Township	Hebei	Chengde	Longhua
Jiutun Manchu Ethnic Township	Hebei	Chengde	Longhua
Xi'achao Manchu and Mongol Ethnic Township	Hebei	Chengde	Longhua
Baihugou Mongol and Manchu Ethnic Township	Hebei	Chengde	Longhua
Liuxi Manchu Ethnic Township	Hebei	Chengde	Pingquan
Qijiadai Manchu Ethnic Township	Hebei	Chengde	Pingquan
Pingfang Manchu and Mongol Ethnic Township	Hebei	Chengde	Pingquan
Maolangou Manchu and Mongol Ethnic Township	Hebei	Chengde	Pingquan
Xuzhangzi Manchu Ethnic Township	Hebei	Chengde	Pingquan
Nanwushijia Manchu and Mongol Ethnic Township	Hebei	Chengde	Pingquan
Guozhangzi Manchu Ethnic Township	Hebei	Chengde	Pingquan
Hongqi Manchu Ethnic Township	Heilongjiang	Harbin	Nangang
Xingfu Manchu Ethnic Township	Heilongjiang	Harbin	Shuangcheng
Lequn Manchu Ethnic Township	Heilongjiang	Harbin	Shuangcheng
Tongxin Manchu Ethnic Township	Heilongjiang	Harbin	Shuangcheng
Xiqin Manchu Ethnic Township	Heilongjiang	Harbin	Shuangcheng
Gongzheng Manchu Ethnic Township	Heilongjiang	Harbin	Shuangcheng
Lianxing Manchu Ethnic Township	Heilongjiang	Harbin	Shuangcheng
Xinxing Manchu Ethnic Township	Heilongjiang	Harbin	Shuangcheng
Qingling Manchu Ethnic Township	Heilongjiang	Harbin	Shuangcheng
Nongfeng Manchu and Xibe Ethnic Town	Heilongjiang	Harbin	Shuangcheng
Yuejin Manchu Ethnic Township	Heilongjiang	Harbin	Shuangcheng
Lalin Manchu Ethnic Town	Heilongjiang	Harbin	Wuchang
Hongqi Manchu Ethnic Township	Heilongjiang	Harbin	Wuchang
Niujia Manchu Ethnic Town	Heilongjiang	Harbin	Wuchang
Yingchengzi Manchu Ethnic Township	Heilongjiang	Harbin	Wuchang
Shuangqiaozi Manchu Ethnic Township	Heilongjiang	Harbin	Wuchang
Liaodian Manchu Ethnic Township	Heilongjiang	Harbin	Acheng
Shuishiying Manchu Ethnic Township	Heilongjiang	Qiqihar	Ang'angxi
Youyi Daur, Kirgiz and Manchu Ethnic Township	Heilongjiang	Qiqihar	Fuyu
Taha Manchu and Daur Ethnic Township	Heilongjiang	Qiqihar	Fuyu
Jiangnan Korean and Manchu Ethnic Township	Heilongjiang	Mudanjiang	Ning'an
Chengdong Korean and Manchu Ethnic Township	Heilongjiang	Mudanjiang	Ning'an
Sijiazi Manchu Ethnic Township	Heilongjiang	Heihe	Aihui
Yanjiang Daur and Manchu Ethnic Township	Heilongjiang	Heihe	Sunwu
Suisheng Manchu Ethnic Town	Heilongjiang	Suihua	Beilin
Yong'an Manchu Ethnic Town	Heilongjiang	Suihua	Beilin
Hongqi Manchu Ethnic Township	Heilongjiang	Suihua	Beilin
Huiqi Manchu Ethnic Town	Heilongjiang	Suihua	Wangkui
Xiangbai Manchu Ethnic Township	Heilongjiang	Suihua	Wangkui
Lingshan Manchu Ethnic Township	Heilongjiang	Suihua	Wangkui
Fuxing Manchu Ethnic Township	Heilongjiang	Hegang	Suibin
Chengfu Korean and Manchu Ethnic Township	Heilongjiang	Shuangyashan	Youyi
Longshan Manchu Ethnic Township	Jilin	Siping	Gongzhuling
Ershijiazi Manchu Ethnic Town	Jilin	Siping	Gongzhuling
Sanjiazi Manchu Ethnic Township	Jilin	Yanbian	Hunchun
Yangpao Manchu Ethnic Township	Jilin	Yanbian	Hunchun
Wulajie Manchu Ethnic Town	Jilin	Jilin City	Longtan
Dakouqin Manchu Ethnic Town	Jilin	Jilin City	Yongji
Liangjiazi Manchu Ethnic Township	Jilin	Jilin City	Yongji
Jinjia Manchu Ethnic Township	Jilin	Jilin City	Yongji
Tuchengzi Manchu and Korean Ethnic Township	Jilin	Jilin City	Yongji
Jindou Korean and Manchu Ethnic Township	Jilin	Tonghua	Tonghua County
Daquanyuan Korean and Manchu Ethnic Township	Jilin	Tonghua	Tonghua County
Xiaoyang Manchu and Korean Ethnic Township	Jilin	Tonghua	Meihekou
Sanhe Manchu and Korean Ethnic Township	Jilin	Liaoyuan	Dongfeng County
Mantang Manchu Ethnic Township	Liaoning	Shenyang	Dongling
Liushutun Mongol and Manchu Ethnic Township	Liaoning	Shenyang	Kangping
Shajintai Mongol and Manchu Ethnic Township	Liaoning	Shenyang	Kangping
Dongsheng Manchu and Mongol Ethnic Township	Liaoning	Shenyang	Kangping
Liangguantun Mongol and Manchu Ethnic Township	Liaoning	Shenyang	Kangping
Shihe Manchu Ethnic Town	Liaoning	Dalian	Jinzhou
Qidingshan Manchu Ethnic Township	Liaoning	Dalian	Jinzhou
Taling Manchu Ethnic Township	Liaoning	Dalian	Zhuanghe
Gaoling Manchu Ethnic Township	Liaoning	Dalian	Zhuanghe
Guiyunhua Manchu Ethnic Township	Liaoning	Dalian	Zhuanghe
Sanjiashan Manchu Ethnic Township	Liaoning	Dalian	Zhuanghe
Yangjia Manchu Ethnic Township	Liaoning	Dalian	Wafangdian
Santai Manchu Ethnic Township	Liaoning	Dalian	Wafangdian
Laohutun Manchu Ethnic Township	Liaoning	Dalian	Wafangdian
Dagushan Manchu Ethnic Town	Liaoning	Anshan	Qianshan
Songsantaizi Korean and Manchu Ethnic Town	Liaoning	Anshan	Qianshan
Lagu Manchu Ethnic Township	Liaoning	Fushun	Fushun County
Tangtu Manchu Ethnic Township	Liaoning	Fushun	Fushun County
Sishanling Manchu Ethnic Township	Liaoning	Benxi	Nanfen
Xiamatang Manchu Ethnic Town	Liaoning	Benxi	Nanfen
Huolianzhai Hui and Manchu Ethnic Town	Liaoning	Benxi	Xihu
Helong Manchu Ethnic Township	Liaoning	Dandong	Donggang
Longwangmiao Manchu and Xibe Ethnic Town	Liaoning	Dandong	Donggang
Juliangtun Manchu Ethnic Township	Liaoning	Jinzhou	Yi
Jiudaoling Manchu Ethnic Township	Liaoning	Jinzhou	Yi
Dizangsi Manchu Ethnic Township	Liaoning	Jinzhou	Yi
Hongqiangzi Manchu Ethnic Township	Liaoning	Jinzhou	Yi
Liulonggou Manchu Ethnic Township	Liaoning	Jinzhou	Yi
Shaohuyingzi Manchu Ethnic Township	Liaoning	Jinzhou	Yi
Dadingpu Manchu Ethnic Township	Liaoning	Jinzhou	Yi
Toutai Manchu Ethnic Township	Liaoning	Jinzhou	Yi
Toudaohe Manchu Ethnic Township	Liaoning	Jinzhou	Yi
Chefang Manchu Ethnic Township	Liaoning	Jinzhou	Yi
Wuliangdian Manchu Ethnic Town	Liaoning	Jinzhou	Yi
Baichanmen Manchu Ethnic Town	Liaoning	Jinzhou	Heishan
Zhen'an Manchu Ethnic Township	Liaoning	Jinzhou	Heishan
Wendilou Manchu Ethnic Township	Liaoning	Jinzhou	Linghai
Youwei Manchu Ethnic Town	Liaoning	Jinzhou	Linghai
East Liujiazi Manchu and Mongol Ethnic Town	Liaoning	Fuxin	Zhangwu
West Liujiazi Manchu and Mongol Ethnic Town	Liaoning	Fuxin	Zhangwu
Jidongyu Manchu Ethnic Township	Liaoning	Liaoyang	Liaoyang County
Shuiquan Manchu Ethnic Township	Liaoning	Liaoyang	Liaoyang County
Tianshui Manchu Ethnic Township	Liaoning	Liaoyang	Liaoyang County
Quantou Manchu Ethnic Town	Liaoning	Tieling	Changtu County
Babaotun Manchu, Xibe and Korean Ethnic Town	Liaoning	Tieling	Kaiyuan
Huangqizhai Manchu Ethnic Township	Liaoning	Tieling	Kaiyuan
Shangfeidi Manchu Ethnic Township	Liaoning	Tieling	Kaiyuan
Xiafeidi Manchu Ethnic Township	Liaoning	Tieling	Kaiyuan
Linfeng Manchu Ethnic Township	Liaoning	Tieling	Kaiyuan
Baiqizhai Manchu Ethnic Township	Liaoning	Tieling	Tieling County
Hengdaohezi Manchu Ethnic Township	Liaoning	Tieling	Tieling County
Chengping Manchu Ethnic Township	Liaoning	Tieling	Xifeng
Dexing Manchu Ethnic Township	Liaoning	Tieling	Xifeng
Helong Manchu Ethnic Township	Liaoning	Tieling	Xifeng
Jinxing Manchu Ethnic Township	Liaoning	Tieling	Xifeng
Mingde Manchu Ethnic Township	Liaoning	Tieling	Xifeng
Songshu Manchu Ethnic Township	Liaoning	Tieling	Xifeng
Yingcheng Manchu Ethnic Township	Liaoning	Tieling	Xifeng
Xipingpo Manchu Ethnic Township	Liaoning	Huludao	Suizhong
Dawangmiao Manchu Ethnic Township	Liaoning	Huludao	Suizhong
Fanjia Manchu Ethnic Township	Liaoning	Huludao	Suizhong
Gaodianzi Manchu Ethnic Township	Liaoning	Huludao	Suizhong
Gejia Manchu Ethnic Township	Liaoning	Huludao	Suizhong
Huangdi Manchu Ethnic Town	Liaoning	Huludao	Suizhong
Huangjia Manchu Ethnic Township	Liaoning	Huludao	Suizhong
Kuanbang Manchu Ethnic Township	Liaoning	Huludao	Suizhong
Mingshui Manchu Ethnic Township	Liaoning	Huludao	Suizhong
Shahe Manchu Ethnic Township	Liaoning	Huludao	Suizhong
Wanghu Manchu Ethnic Township	Liaoning	Huludao	Suizhong
Xiaozhuangzi Manchu Ethnic Township	Liaoning	Huludao	Suizhong
Yejia Manchu Ethnic Town	Liaoning	Huludao	Suizhong
Gaotai Manchu Ethnic Township	Liaoning	Huludao	Suizhong
Baita Manchu Ethnic Township	Liaoning	Huludao	Xingcheng
Caozhuang Manchu Ethnic Town	Liaoning	Huludao	Xingcheng
Dazhai Manchu Ethnic Township	Liaoning	Huludao	Xingcheng
Dongxinzhuang Manchu Ethnic Township	Liaoning	Huludao	Xingcheng
Gaojialing Manchu Ethnic Township	Liaoning	Huludao	Xingcheng
Guojia Manchu Ethnic Town	Liaoning	Huludao	Xingcheng
Haibin Manchu Ethnic Township	Liaoning	Huludao	Xingcheng
Hongyazi Manchu Ethnic Township	Liaoning	Huludao	Xingcheng
Jianjin Manchu Ethnic Township	Liaoning	Huludao	Xingcheng
Jianchang Manchu Ethnic Township	Liaoning	Huludao	Xingcheng
Jiumen Manchu Ethnic Township	Liaoning	Huludao	Xingcheng
Liutaizi Manchu Ethnic Township	Liaoning	Huludao	Xingcheng
Nandashan Manchu Ethnic Township	Liaoning	Huludao	Xingcheng
Shahousuo Manchu Ethnic Township	Liaoning	Huludao	Xingcheng
Wanghai Manchu Ethnic Township	Liaoning	Huludao	Xingcheng
Weiping Manchu Ethnic Township	Liaoning	Huludao	Xingcheng
Wenjia Manchu Ethnic Township	Liaoning	Huludao	Xingcheng
Yang'an Manchu Ethnic Township	Liaoning	Huludao	Xingcheng
Yaowangmiao Manchu Ethnic Township	Liaoning	Huludao	Xingcheng
Yuantaizi Manchu Ethnic Township	Liaoning	Huludao	Xingcheng
Erdaowanzi Manchu Ethnic Township	Liaoning	Huludao	Jianchang
Xintaimen Manchu Ethnic Township	Liaoning	Huludao	Lianshan
Manzutun Manchu Ethnic Township	Inner Mongolia	Hinggan	Horqin Right Front Banner
Guanjiayingzi Manchu Ethnic Township	Inner Mongolia	Chifeng	Songshan
Shijia Manchu Ethnic Township	Inner Mongolia	Chifeng	Harqin Banner
Caonian Manchu Ethnic Township	Inner Mongolia	Ulanqab	Liangcheng
Sungezhuang Manchu Ethnic Township	Tianjin	N/A	Ji

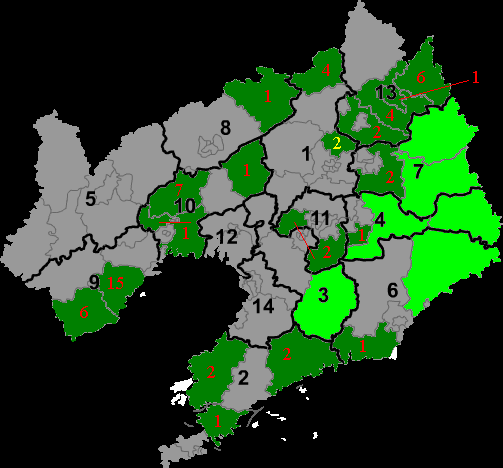
Manchu autonomous area in Liaoning. (Note: Autonomous counties are shown in bright green. Counties with autonomous townships are in dark green, with the number of Manchu townships in each county shown in red (or yellow). So are another 2 pictures.)

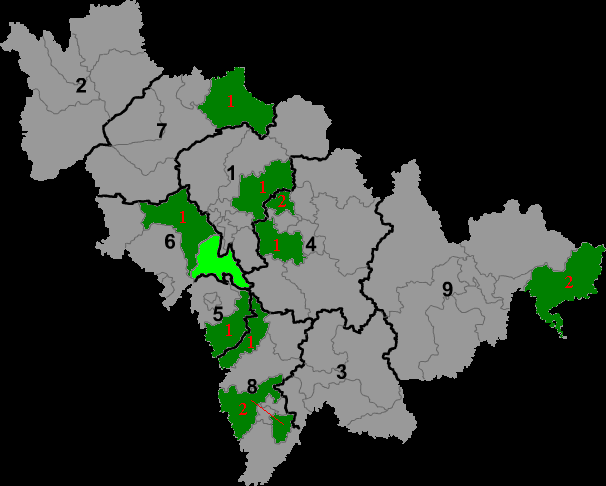
Manchu autonomous area in Jilin.

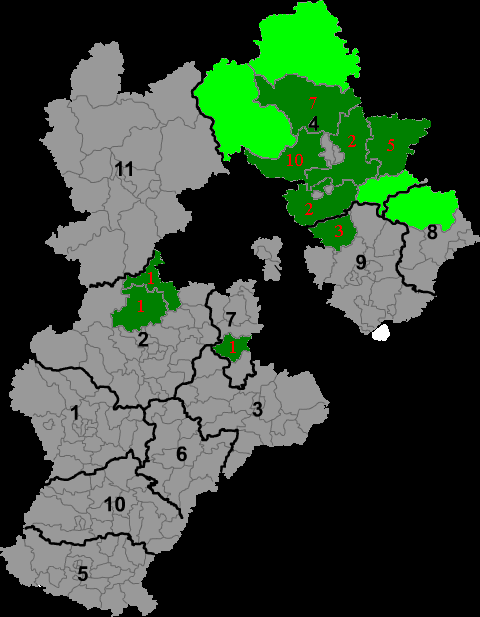
Manchu autonomous area in Hebei.

=== Other areas ===
Manchu people living outside mainland China include approximately 12,000 Manchus in Taiwan. Most of them moved to Taiwan with the ROC government in 1949. One notable example was Puru, a famous painter and calligrapher who founded the Manchu Association of the Republic of China.

== Genetics ==
Manchu and qiren (旗人; bannermen) were declared legally equivalent in the 17th century. The Qianlong Emperor referred to all bannermen (whether Manchu or qiren) as Manchu, and referred to all civilians as Han or min (民). Modern China allows all members of the Eight Banner System to register as Manchu, which inflates modern population numbers of Manchus by including non-Jurchen ancestral sources. Additionally, as Manchu identity was traditionally patrilineal, even if the mother was not Manchu, the child would be registered as Manchu as long as the father was in the Manchu banners. The Manchu banners were never genetically homogeneous, as ethnicity was fluid.

The Manchu identity was diverse from its inception. It comprised the Jianzhou and Haixi Jurchen tribes, and two Yeren Jurchen tribes. The Hulun confederacy of the Haixi Jurchens had intermarried with the Khorchin and Kharchin Mongols to such an extent that Nurhaci of the Jianzhou Jurchens described them as "Mongols" to denote their culture as alien and hostile. The Jurchen tribes themselves also included people of Han Chinese descent. Han, who had moved to Nurgan (in present-day Jilin Province) before 1618 and adopted the Jurchen culture and language, were recognized as Jurchens and became part of the Manchu banners. These Han were known as "transfrontiersmen" and became part of the Jurchen elite. They had assimilated into Jurchen culture to the extent that their ancestry was the only thing that differentiated them from the Jurchens. Meanwhile, other Jurchens who had moved to Liaodong and adopted Han customs and language were regarded as Han and could become part of the Han banners, but not the Manchu banners.

Furthermore, the Manchu banners developed a division between the higher ranking "Old Manchus" formed of the main Jurchen tribes such as the Jianzhou and the lower ranking "New Manchus" (伊車滿洲/衣車滿洲; i'ce manju; or 新滿洲) from other Tungusic and Mongolic tribes such as the Daur, Oroqen, Solon, Nanai, Udege, and Sibe from the northeast who were incorporated into the Manchu banners by the Shunzhi and Kangxi Emperors after 1644.

=== Paternal Y Haplogroups ===
A study of the Manchu population of Liaoning reported a close genetic relationship and significant signals of admixture from Northern Han Chinese. The Liaoning Manchu were formed from a major ancestral component related to Yellow River farmers and a minor ancestral component linked to ancient populations from the Amur River Basin or other sources. The Manchu were therefore an exception to the coherent genetic structure of Tungusic-speaking populations, likely due to the large-scale population migrations.

A 2010 study reported that in a sample of 111 Liaoning Manchus and 25 Heilongjiang Manchus, 25 Liaoning Manchus (22.52%) and 11 Heilongjiang Manchus (44.00%) had Y haplogroup C.

The Y DNA of the royal Aisin Gioro clan is believed to be C2b1a3a2-F8951, which is a subclade of C2a-L1373, the "northern" branch of haplogroup C2-M217. The Aisin Gioro paternal lineage is also closely related to that of the Ao clan of the Khitan-Mongolic Daur ethnic group; both Ao and Aisin Gioro diverged only a couple of centuries ago from a common ancestor. The Mongolic C2*-Star Cluster (C2b1a3a1-F3796) haplogroup is a fraternal branch to Aisin Gioro's C2b1a3a2-F8951 haplogroup. In the database of the Chinese DNA company 23Mofang, 1/3 of the Gūwalgiya clan have haplogroup C-F11330, which also descended from the northern C2a-L1373. In the 23Mofang database, 40% of the Yehe Nara clan have haplogroup C, and 20% have C-MF46267, which descended from C-M407, the same branch as Dayan Khan. C-M407 is also widespread among Buryats and Oirats, suggesting that they may share similar paternal origins with the Yehe Nara clan.

=== Autosomal DNA ===
Manchus can be modeled as having West Liao River-related ancestry (83%) and Iron Age Taiwan-related ancestry (17%). There is no significant evidence of West Eurasian admixture in Manchus compared to their Tungusic neighbors. Overall, Manchus cluster with Northern Han Chinese, some Yugurs, and Koreans, who themselves cluster with Japanese.

According to a 2023 study, the Manchu and Han in Northeastern China were genetically distinct, possibly due to historical policies and limited intermarriage. Northeastern Han clustered with Han Chinese from the Central Plains and the Qiang from Sichuan, indicating historical migrations, substantial gene flow, and intermarriage among these groups. The genetic distance between Manchus and Han Chinese increases as one moves northward from Liaoning toward Heilongjiang.

== Culture ==
=== Influence on other Tungusic peoples ===
The Manchus implemented measures to Manchufy the other Tungusic peoples living around the Amur River basin. The southern Tungusic Manchus influenced the northern Tungusic peoples linguistically, culturally, and religiously.

=== Language ===
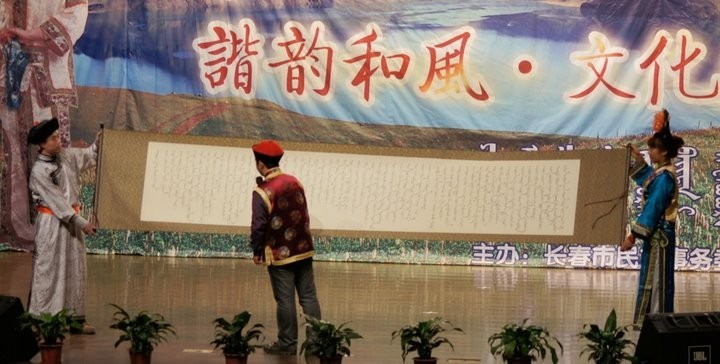
"Banjin Inenggi" and Manchu linguistic activity by the government and students in Changchun, 2011

The Manchu language is a Tungusic language and has many dialects. Standard Manchu originates from the accent of Jianzhou Jurchens and was officially standardized during Qianlong's reign. During the Qing dynasty, Manchus at the imperial court were required to speak Standard Manchu or face the emperor's reprimand. This applied equally to the palace presbyter for shamanic rites when performing sacrifice.

Despite the imperial court's promotion of the Manchu language, its decline among the bannermen in the military had already started by the early 18th century. In the latter half of the 18th century, some Manchu officials did not understand the Manchu language. By the early 19th century, even the imperial court had lost fluency in the Manchu language and the emperor complained that his officials had difficulty understanding or writing Manchu.

After the 19th century, most Manchus had gained a perfect understanding of Standard Chinese and the number of Manchu speakers dwindled. After the Qing dynasty collapsed, Manchu lost its status as a national language, and its official use in education ended. Manchus generally speak Standard Chinese. The remaining skilled native Manchu speakers number less than 100, (Note: Less than 100 native speakers. Several thousand people can speak Manchu as a second language through primary education or free classes for adults in China.) most of whom are to be found in Sanjiazi (Manchu: ᡳᠯᠠᠨ
ᠪᠣᡠ, Möllendorff: ilan boo, Abkai: ilan bou), Heilongjiang Province. Since the government workers, scholars, and social activists have begun to resurrect Manchu. With the help of governments in Liaoning, Jilin, and Heilongjiang, many schools offer Manchu classes. Manchu volunteers in many parts of China teach Manchu. Thousands of non-Manchus have learned the language through these pathways.

In an effort to save Manchu culture from extinction, the older generation of Manchus teaches young people, often without charge.

=== Alphabet ===
The Jurchens, ancestors of the Manchus, created Jurchen script during the Jin dynasty. After the Jin dynasty collapsed, the Jurchen script gradually fell out of use. In the Ming dynasty, 60–70% of Jurchens wrote letters in Mongolian script, while 30–40% used Chinese characters. This persisted until Nurhaci revolted against the Ming Empire. Nurhaci considered it a major impediment that his people lacked a script of their own, so he commanded scholars G'ag'ai and Erdeni to create Manchu characters by reference to Mongolian scripts. They created Manchu script, which is called "script without dots and circles" (Manchu: ᡨᠣᠩᡴᡳ
ᡶᡠᡴᠠ
ᠠᡴᡡ
ᡥᡝᡵᡤᡝᠨ, Möllendorff: tongki fuka akū hergen, Abkai: tongki fuka akv hergen; 无圈点满文) or "old Manchu script" (老满文). Due to its hurried creation, the script has defects. Some vowels and consonants were difficult to distinguish. Shortly afterwards, their successor Dahai used dots and circles to distinguish vowels, aspirated and non-aspirated consonants and thus completed the script. His achievement is called "script with dots and circles" or "new Manchu script".

=== Lifestyle ===
The Manchus were sedentary agriculturalists who lived in permanent villages, cultivated crops, and practiced hunting and mounted archery.

The southern Tungusic Manchu sedentary lifestyle differed from the nomadic --hunter-gathererforager lifestyle of their more northern Tungusic relatives, like the Warka, prompting the Qing state to attempt to force them to adopt the Manchu sedentary farming lifestyle.

=== Names and naming practices ===
==== Family names ====
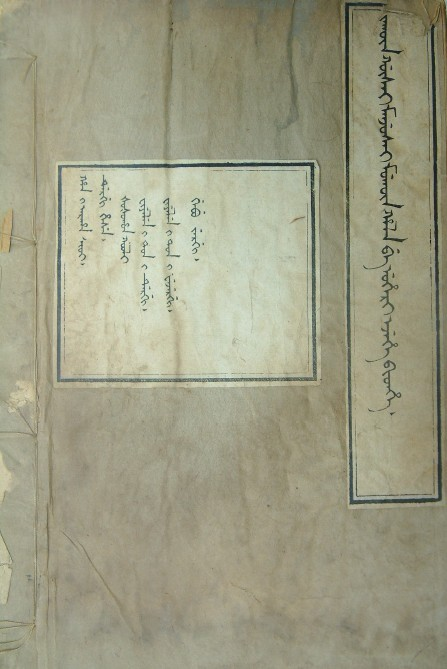
The cover of the Eight Manchu Banners' Surname-Clans' Book

The history of Manchu family names follows the Jurchen family name. However, after the Mongols extinguished the Jin dynasty, the Manchus started to adopt Mongol culture, including their custom of using only their given name until the end of the Qing dynasty, a practice confounding non-Manchus, leading them to conclude, erroneously, that they do not have family names.

A Manchu family name usually has two portions: the first is "Mukūn" (ᠮᡠᡴᡡᠨ, Abkai: Mukvn) which literally means "branch name"; the second, "Hala" (ᡥᠠᠯᠠ), represents the clan name. According to the Book of the Eight Manchu Banners' Surname-Clans (八旗滿洲氏族通譜), Manchu's use 1,114 family names. Gūwalgiya, Niohuru, Hešeri, Šumulu, Tatara, Gioro, Nara are considered as "famous clans" (著姓) among Manchus.

Stories tell of Han migrating to the Jurchens and assimilating into Manchu Jurchen society. Nikan Wailan may have been an example of this. The Manchu Cuigiya (崔佳氏) clan claimed that a Han Chinese founded their clan. The Tohoro (托活络) clan (Duanfang's clan) claimed Han Chinese origin.

==== Given names ====
Manchus given names are distinctive. Generally, they take several forms, such as bearing suffixes "-ngga", "-ngge" or "-nggo", meaning "having the quality of"; bearing Mongol style suffixes "-tai" or "-tu", meaning "having"; bearing the suffix, "-ju", "-boo"; numerals (Note: e.g. Nadanju (70 in Manchu), Susai (5 in Manchu), Liošici(67, a Mandarin homophone) and Bašinu(85, a Mandarin homophone))} or animal names. (Note: e.g. Dorgon (badger) and Arsalan (lion))}

Some ethnic names can serve as given names. One of the common first names is Nikan, which is also a Manchu exonym for the Han Chinese. For example, Nikan Wailan was a Jurchen leader who was an enemy of Nurhaci. Nikan was also the name of one of the Aisin-Gioro princes and grandsons of Nurhaci who supported Prince Dorgon. Nurhaci's first son was Cuyen, one of whose sons was Nikan.

Manchus primarily use Chinese family and given names. However, some still use a Manchu family name and Chinese given name, (Note: e.g. Aisin Gioro Qixiang, a famous Chinese calligrapher.) a Chinese family name and Manchu given name (Note: e.g. Ying Batu, Ying Bayan, the sons of a famous Manchu director, Ying Da.) or both Manchu family and given names. (Note: e.g. Aisin-Gioro Ulhicun, a famous scholar of Khitan and Manchu linguistic studies.)

=== Burial customs ===
The Jurchens and their Manchu descendants originally practiced cremation and almost all of them practice it today. Very few adopted the burial practice from some Han Chinese. Princes were cremated on pyres.

=== Hair ===
The traditional hairstyle for Manchu men is shaving the front of their heads while growing the hair on the back of their heads into a single braid called a queue (辮子; biànzi), known as soncoho in Manchu. During the Qing dynasty, the queue was legally mandated for male Ming Chinese subjects. The Ming were to shave their foreheads and begin growing their queues within 10 days of the order. If they refused to comply, they were executed for treason. Throughout the rest of the Qing dynasty, the queue was seen as a signal of loyalty, as it showed who had submitted. As the Qing dynasty came to an end, the hairstyle shifted from a symbol of loyalty to one of feudalism, leading many men to cut off their queues as a statement of rebellion. These acts gave China a step toward modernization and moved it away from imperial rule as China began to adopt more of Western culture, including fashion and appearance.

Manchu women wore their hair in a distinctive hairstyle called liangbatou (兩把頭).

=== Garments ===
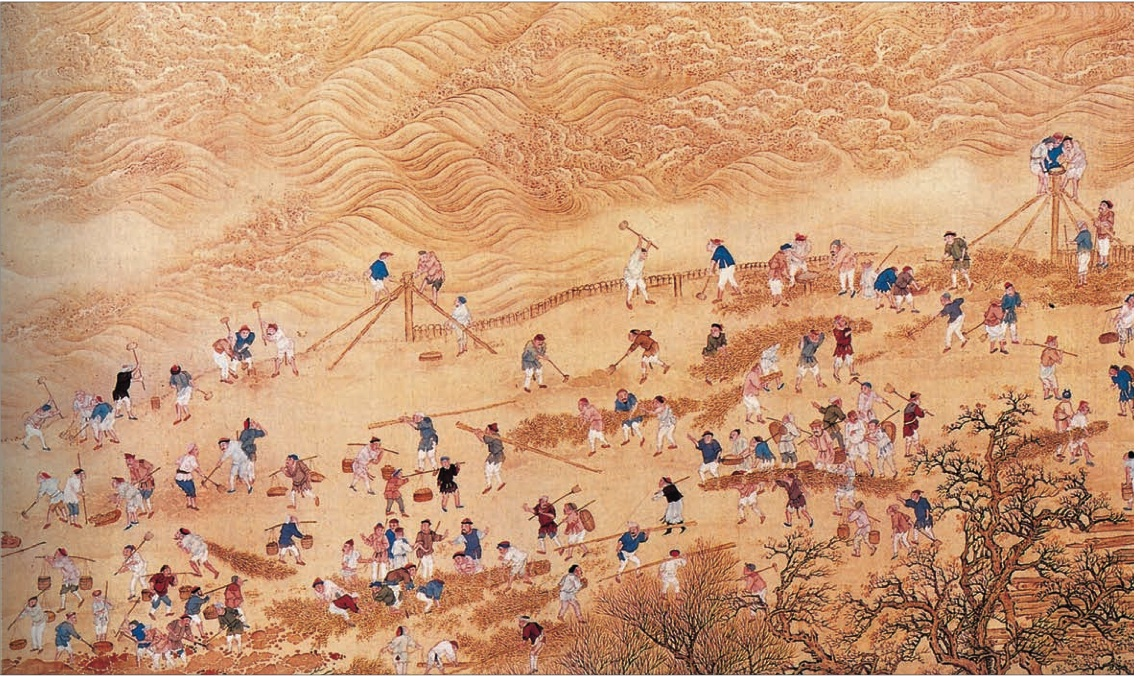
Han and Manchu clothing coexisted during Qing dynasty

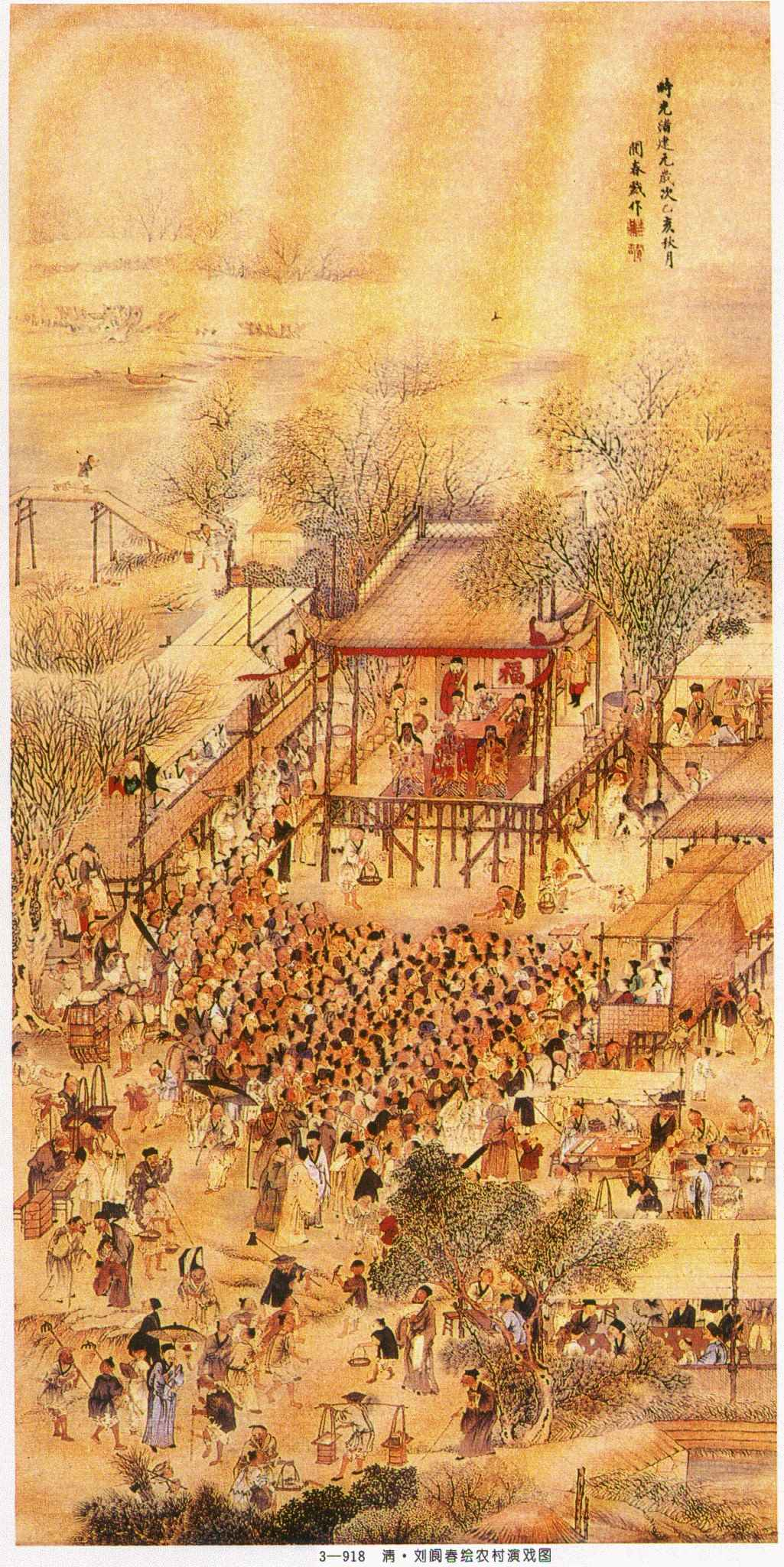
Han Chinese clothing in early Qing

A common misconception among Han Chinese was that Manchu clothing was distinct from Hanfu. Manchu clothing was actually modified Ming Hanfu, despite Manchu efforts to present their attire as unique. Lacking their own textiles, Manchus initially acquired Ming dragon robes and cloth through tribute or trade. They adapted these robes by narrowing sleeves with fur cuffs and adding slits to the skirt for falconry, horse riding, and archery. A strip of cloth was added at the waist, with the skirt pleated for a snug fit. Sable fur was incorporated into skirts, cuffs, and collars, trimming Ming dragon robes. Manchus modified Han Chinese court costumes by adding a large ceremonial collar (da-ling) or shawl collar (pijian-ling). The belief that Manchu hunting attire evolved into Qing clothing arose from comparing the straight-cut Ming garments with the irregularly shaped Qing long pao and chao fu. Western scholars mistakenly viewed these as purely Manchu. Excavations from Ming tombs, such as the Wanli emperor's, revealed chao fu robes with embroidered or woven dragons, similar to Qing chao fu, but distinct from long pao dragon robes. Flared skirts with right-side fastenings and fitted bodices were found in the tombs of Ming officials and the imperial family in Beijing, Shanxi, Jiangxi, Jiangsu, and Shandong.Ming chao fu upper sleeves had two attached cloth pieces, a feature retained in Qing chao fu with sleeve extensions. Qing long pao resembled Yuan dynasty clothing, such as robes from Li Youan's Shandong tomb, with flared hems and tight arms and torso. Ming robes drew from earlier Han Chinese dynasties, while Qing chao fu appeared in official portraits, unlike Ming chao fu, suggesting they were worn under formal robes. In Japan's Nara, the Shosoin repository at Todaiji temple holds 30 Tang dynasty short coats (hanpi), influencing Ming dragon robes. These consist of a skirt and bodice with distinct fabrics and patterns, shaping Qing chao fu. Cross-over closures appear in both hanpi and Ming garments. Tombs from the Han dynasty and Jin dynasty (266–420) in Yingban, near the Tianshan mountains in Xinjiang, contain clothing resembling Qing long pao and Tang hanpi, indicating a long-standing Chinese garment tradition influencing Qing chao fu. Ming robes, the basis for Qing chao fu, were prestigious burial attire despite rare depiction in portraits. Qing rulers emulated ancient Chinese practices to assert legitimacy, reviving rituals and designing sacrificial vessels closer to ancient Chinese models than Ming ones. Tungusic groups like the Udeghe, Ulchi, and Nanai on the Amur River adopted Chinese influences, including dragon-adorned ceremonial robes, scroll and spiral designs, and technologies like silk, cotton, and heated houses. The Spencer Museum of Art holds six long pao robes of Han Chinese Qing nobility. Han Chinese and Manchu nobles had two skirt slits, while the imperial family had four. Qing sumptuary laws permitted nine dragons for first- to third-rank officials and nobles, with four-clawed dragons for officials and nobles, and five-clawed dragons for the imperial family. Han Chinese nobles' robes at the Spencer Museum feature five-clawed dragons, violating these laws.

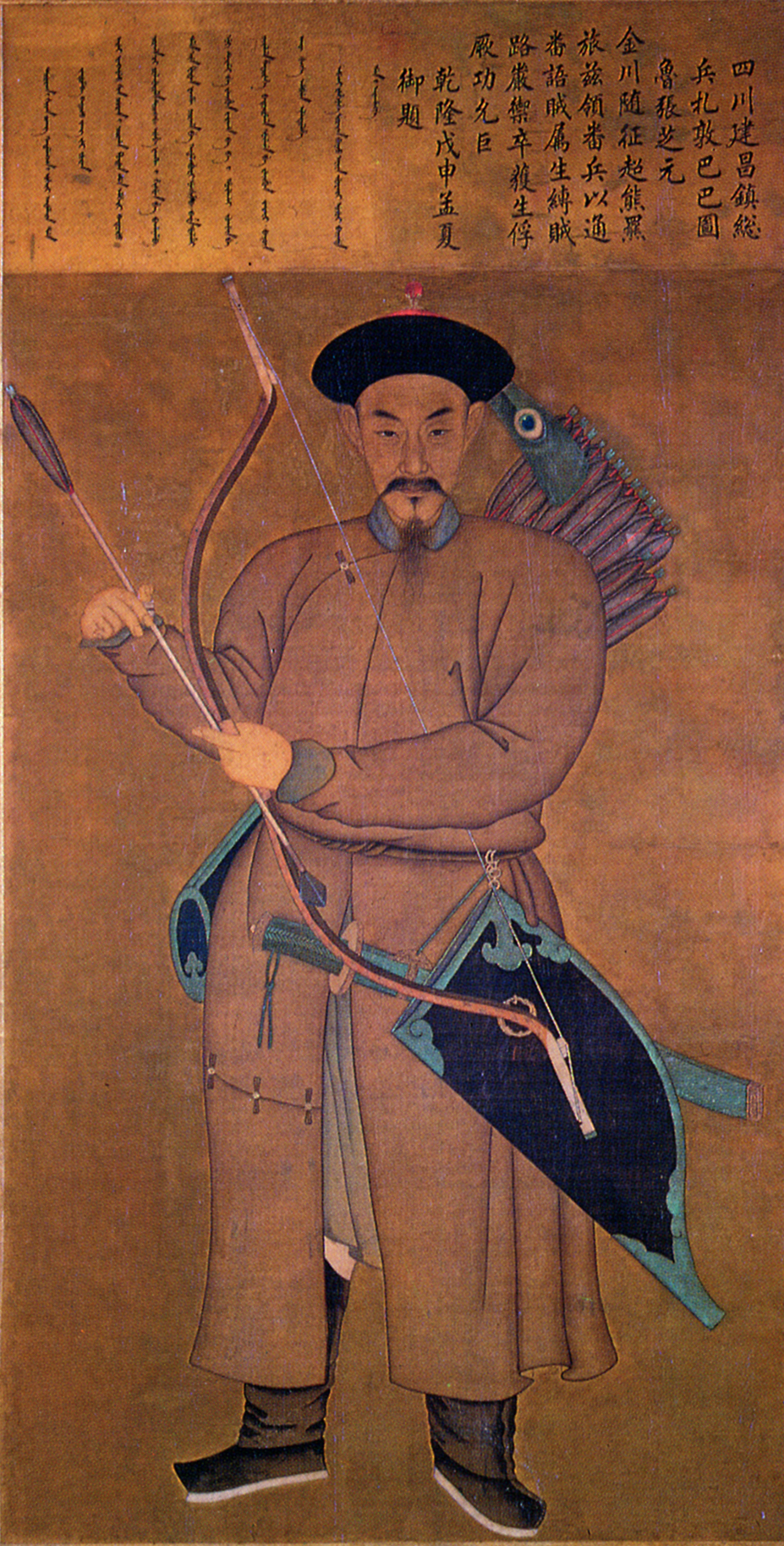
Han Chinese general Zhang Zhiyuan in Qing military attire.

Early Manchu clothing followed Jurchen tradition, favoring white. Robes, designed for archery, were the most common garment. A surcoat, derived from the Eight Banners military uniform, was often worn over the robe, gaining popularity among commoners during the Kangxi period. Modern Chinese suits like the Cheongsam and Tangzhuang evolved from these. Manchu hats, worn year-round by all ages, contrasted with Han Chinese custom of wearing hats from age 20. Formal hats used straw for spring and summer, fur for fall and winter, while casual hats were called Mandarin hats in English. Manchu women traditionally wore three earrings per ear, a practice continued by some older women. Men wore one earring in youth, but none as adults. The fergetun, a thumb ring originally made from reindeer bone for archery, became decorative, with valuable versions in jade or ivory after 1644. High-heeled shoes were common among Manchu women.

=== Activities ===
==== Riding and archery ====
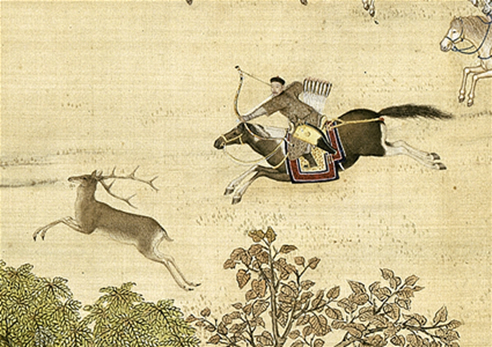
Painting of the Qianlong Emperor hunting

Riding and archery (Manchu: ᠨᡳᠶᠠᠮᠨᡳᠶᠠᠨ, Möllendorff: niyamniyan, Abkai: niyamniyan) are significant to Manchus. They were well-trained horsemen. Hong Taiji said, "Riding and archery are the most important martial arts of our country". The Qing dynasty treasured riding and archery. Every spring and fall, ordinary Manchus and aristocrats took riding and archery tests. The results could affect their rank in the nobility. The Manchus of the early Qing dynasty had excellent shooting skills, and their arrows were reputed to be capable of penetrating two bodies.

In the middle period of the Qing dynasty, archery became more of a form of entertainment, such as hunting swans and shooting fabric or silk targets. The most difficult was shooting a candle hanging in the air at night. Gambling was banned, but archery contests were not limited. It was common for Manchus to place signs outside their houses to invite challenges. After the Qianlong period, Manchus gradually neglected riding and archery, even though their rulers did encourage Manchus to continue their traditions. These traditions are still practiced among some Manchus.

==== Wrestling ====
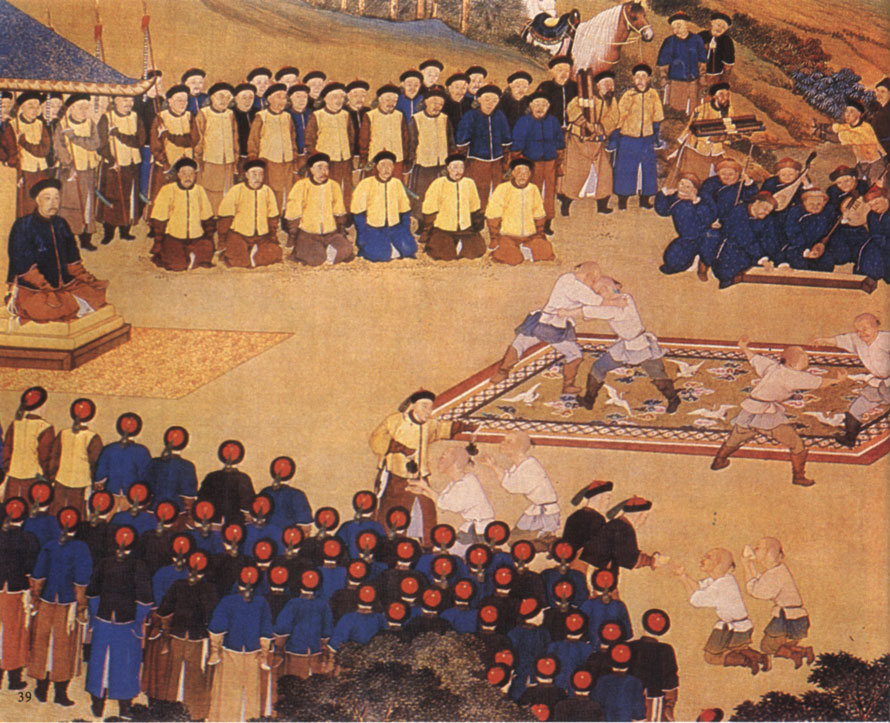
Manchu wrestlers competed in front of the Qianlong Emperor

Manchu wrestling (Manchu: ᠪᡠᡴᡠ, Möllendorff: buku, Abkai: buku) is an important martial art of the Manchu people. Buku, meaning "wrestling" or "man of unusual strength" in Manchu, was originally from a Mongolian word, bökh. Manchu wrestling can be traced back to Jurchen wrestling, which emerged from Khitan wrestling, which was similar to Mongolian wrestling. In the Yuan dynasty, the Jurchens who lived in northeast China adopted Mongol culture including bökh. In the latter Jin and early Qing period, rulers encouraged the populace, including aristocrats, to practise buku as part of military training. At the time, Mongol wrestlers were the most famous and powerful. By the Chongde period, Manchus had developed their own well-trained wrestlers and in the Qianlong period, they surpassed Mongol wrestlers. The Qing court established the Shan Pu Battalion and chose 200 wrestlers divided into three levels. Manchu wrestling moves can be found in today's Chinese wrestling, shuai jiao, which is its most important part. Among many branches, Beijing wrestling adopted the most Manchu wrestling moves.

==== Falconry ====
As a result of their hunting traditions, Manchus are interested in falconry. Gyrfalcon (Manchu: ᡧᠣᠩᡴᠣᡵᠣ, Möllendorff: šongkoro, Abkai: xongkoro) is the most highly valued discipline in Manchu falconry. In the Qing period, giving a gyrfalcon to the royal court in tribute could be met with a considerable reward. Professional falconers lived in the Ningguta area (today's Heilongjiang province and the northern part of Jilin province). Beijing's Manchus also practice falconry. Compared to Manchuria, it is more of an entertainment. The Imperial Household Department of Beijing kept professional falconers. They provided falcons to the emperor when he went to hunt each fall. Manchu traditional falconry continues to be practised in some regions.

==== Ice skating ====
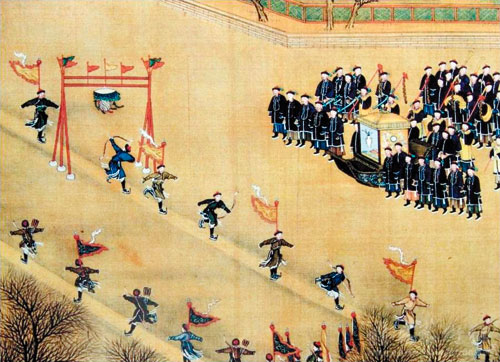
The performance of Manchu palace skaters on holiday

Ice skating (Manchu: ᠨᡳᠰᡠᠮᡝ
ᡝᡶᡳᡵᡝ
ᡝᡶᡳᠨ, Möllendorff: nisume efire efin, Abkai: nisume efire efin) is another Manchu pastime. The Qianlong Emperor called it a "national custom". It was one of the most important winter events of the Qing royal household, performed by the "Eight Banner Ice Skating Battalion" (八旗冰鞋营) which was a special force trained to do battle on icy terrain. The battalion consisted of 1600 soldiers. In the Jiaqing period, it was reduced to 500 soldiers and transferred to the Jing Jie Battalion (精捷营) originally, literally meaning "chosen agile battalion".

In the 1930s–1940s, Wu Tongxuan was a famous Manchu skater from the Uya clan in Beijing and one of the royal household skaters during Empress Dowager Cixi's regency. He appeared in many Beijing skating rinks. 20th-century Manchu figure skaters include world champions Zhao Hongbo and Tong Jian.

=== Literature ===
The Tale of the Nisan Shaman (Manchu: ᠨᡳᡧᠠᠨ
ᠰᠠᠮᠠᠨ ‍ᡳ
ᠪᡳᡨᡥᡝ, Möllendorff: nišan saman i bithe, Abkai: nixan saman-i bithe; 尼山萨满传) is the most important piece of Manchu literature. It primarily recounts how Nisan Shaman helps revive a young hunter. The story spread to Xibe, Nanai, Daur, Oroqen, Evenk, and other Tungusic peoples. It has four versions: a handwritten version from Qiqihar; two handwritten versions from Aigun; and one by Manchu writer Dekdengge in Vladivostok (Manchu: ᡥᠠᡳᡧᡝᠨᠸᡝᡳ, Möllendorff: haišenwei, Abkai: haixenwei). The four versions are similar, but Haišenwei's is the most complete. It has been translated into Russian, Chinese, English, and other languages.

Literature written in Chinese by Manchu writers includes Wen Kang's The Tale of Heroic Sons and Daughters (儿女英雄传), Nalan Xingde's Song of Drinking Water (饮水词) and Gu Taiqing's Tianyou Pavilion Collection (天游阁集).

=== Folk art ===
==== Octagonal drum ====
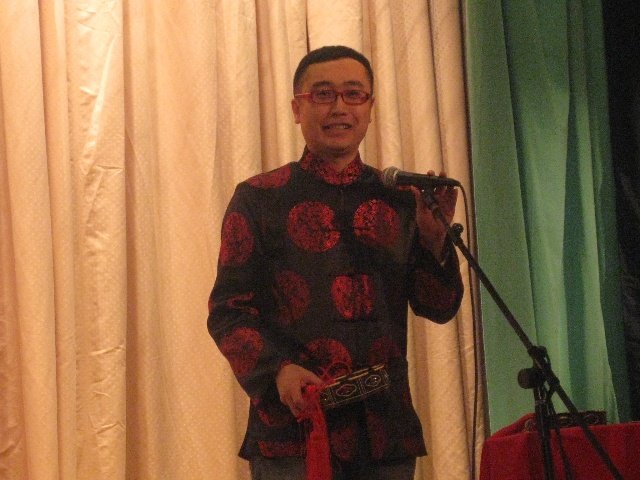
Octagonal drum performance on stage

An octagonal drum is a type of Manchu folk art that was popular among bannermen, especially in Beijing. It is said that the octagonal drum originated with the snare drum of the Eight-banner military and the music was made by banner soldiers on the way home from victory in the battle of Jinchuan. The drum is composed of wood surrounded by bells. The drumhead is made of wyrmhide with tassels at the bottom. The colors of the tassels are yellow, white, red, and blue, which represent the four colors of the Eight Banners. Drummers use their fingers to hit the drumhead and shake the drum to ring the bells. Traditionally, octagonal drum is performed by three people. One is the harpist; one is the clown responsible for the harlequinade; and the third is the singer.

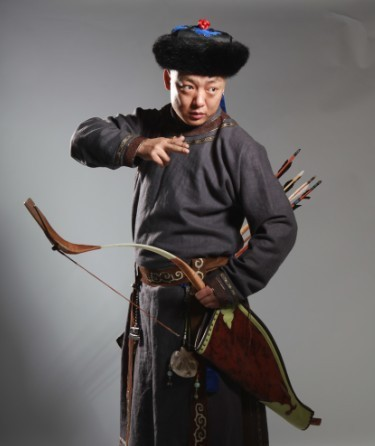
Akšan, Manchu singer and ulabun artist

"Zidishu" is the main libretto of octagonal drum and can be traced back to a type of traditional folk music called the "Manchu Rhythm". Although Zidishu was not created by Han Chinese, it contains many themes from Chinese stories, such as Romance of the Three Kingdoms, Dream of the Red Chamber, Romance of the Western Chamber, Legend of the White Snake, and Strange Stories from a Chinese Studio. Additionally, many works depict the lives of Bannermen. Aisin-Gioro Yigeng, whose pen name was "Helü" and who wrote The Sigh of Old Imperial Bodyguard, is the representative author. Zidishu involves two acts of singing, which are called dongcheng and xicheng.

After the fall of the Qing, the influence of the octagonal drum gradually declined. However, the Chinese monochord and crosstalk which incorporates octagonal drum, remain popular in Chinese society. Many famous Chinese monochord performers and crosstalkers were artists of the octagonal drum, such as De Shoushan and Zhang Sanlu.

==== Ulabun ====
Ulabun (ᡠᠯᠠᠪᡠᠨ) is a form of Manchu storytelling entertainment. Ulabun is popular among the Manchu people living in Manchuria. It has two main categories: one is popular folk literature, such as the Tale of the Nisan Shaman; the other is folk music with an informative, independent plot.

=== Religion ===
Originally, Manchus and their predecessors were principally Buddhists with shamanist influences. After the conquest of China in the 17th century, the Manchus adopted Confucianism from Chinese culture, along with Buddhism, and discouraged shamanism.

==== Manchu shamanism ====
Shamanism has a long history in Manchu civilization and influenced it over thousands of years. John Keay states in A History of China that shaman is the single loan-word from Manchurian into the English language. After the conquest of China, although Manchus officially adopted Buddhism and widely adopted Chinese folk religion, Shamanic traditions could still be found in soul worship, totem worship, belief in nightmares and apotheosis of philanthropists. Apart from Shamanic shrines in the Qing palace, no temples erected for worship of Manchu gods could be found in Beijing. Thus, the story of competition between Shamanists and Lamaists was often heard in Manchuria, but the Manchu emperors officially helped Lamaists.

==== Buddhism ====
Jurchens, the predecessors of the Manchus adopted the Buddhism of Balhae, Goryeo, Liao, and Song in the 10–13th centuries, so it was familiar to the Manchus. Qing emperors were always entitled "Buddha". They were regarded as Mañjuśrī in Tibetan Buddhism and had high attainments.

Hong Taiji, who was of Mongolian descent, started leaning towards Chan Buddhism, the Chinese form known in Japan as Zen Buddhism. Still, Huangtaiji patronized Tibetan Buddhism extensively and publicly. Huangtaiji patronized Buddhism but allegedly felt Tibetan Buddhism to be inferior to Chan Buddhism.

The Qianlong Emperor's faith in Tibetan Buddhism was later questioned because the emperor indicated that he supported the Yellow Church (the Tibetan Buddhist Gelukpa sect)

This policy of supporting only the "Yellow Hats" was used by the Qianlong Emperor to deflect Han criticism, who had the "Lama Shuo" stele engraved in Tibetan, Mongol, Manchu, and Chinese, which said: "By patronizing the Yellow Church we maintain peace among the Mongols." It seems he was wary of the rising power of the Tibetan Kingdom and its influence over the Mongolians and Manchu public, princes and generals.

==== Chinese folk religion ====
Manchus were affected by Chinese folk religions for most of the Qing dynasty. Save for ancestor worship, the gods they consecrated were virtually identical to those of the Han Chinese. Guan Yu worship is a typical example. He was considered the God Protector of the Nation and was worshipped by the Manchus. They referred to him as "Lord Guan" (关老爷). Uttering his name was taboo. In addition, Manchus worshipped Cai Shen and the Kitchen God just as the Han Chinese did. The worship of Mongolian and Tibetan gods was also reported.

==== Christianity ====
===== Roman Catholic =====
Influenced by the Jesuit missionaries in China, many Manchus adopted Catholicism. The earliest Manchu Catholics appeared in the 1650s. In the Yongzheng era, Depei, the Hošo Jiyan Prince, was a Catholic whose baptismal name was "Joseph". His wife was baptised and named "Maria". The sons of Doro Beile Sunu also became devout Catholics. In the Jiaqing period, Tong Hengšan and Tong Lan were Catholic Manchu Bannermen. These Manchu Catholics were persecuted by Qing emperors but they refused to renounce their faith. Manchu Catholics continued in modern times, too, such as Ying Lianzhi, the founder of Fu Jen Catholic University.

=== Holidays ===
Manchus celebrated many traditional holidays. Some are derived from Han Chinese culture, such as the "Spring Festival" and Duanwu Festival. Some are of Manchu origin. Food Exhaustion Day (绝粮日), on every 26th day of the 8th month of the lunar calendar, is another example that was inspired by a story that once Nurhaci and his troops were in a battle and almost running out of food. The villagers nearby heard about the emergency and came to help. Soldiers used perilla leaves to wrap rice. Afterwards, they won the battle. To encourage later generations to remember this hardship, Nurhaci made this day "Food Exhaustion Day". Traditionally, Manchus eat perilla or cabbage wraps with rice, scrambled eggs, beef, or pork. Banjin Inenggi (ᠪᠠᠨᠵᡳᠨ
ᡳᠨᡝᠩᡤᡳ), on the 13th day of the tenth month of the lunar calendar, which started to be celebrated in late 20th century, is the anniversary of the creation of the Manchu name. On that day in 1635, Hong Taiji changed the group's name from Jurchen to Manchu.

== See also ==
- Manchu language and alphabet
- Manchu name and clans
- Manchuria
- Manchukuo
- Qing dynasty and emperors
- Eight Banners and their identity
- Tungusic peoples
- Sushen
- Mohe
- Jurchen
- Sinicization of the Manchus
- Military of the Qing dynasty
