= 榮州 =

榮州 may refer to:

- Rong Prefecture, provinces of ancient China
  - Rong Prefecture, located in what is today Kangping County, Liaoning
  - Rong Prefecture, located in what is today Wanrong County, Shanxi
  - Rong Prefecture, located in what is today Zigong, Sichuan
- Yeongju (영주), a city in North Gyeongsang Province, South Korea
