= Xifeng County, Liaoning =

Xifeng 西丰县
- County
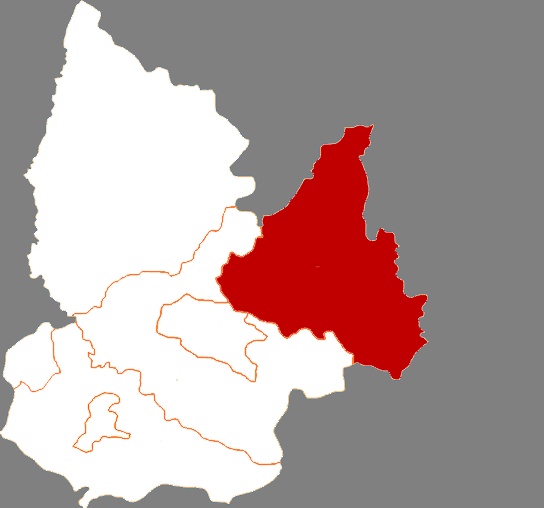
- Xifeng in Tieling

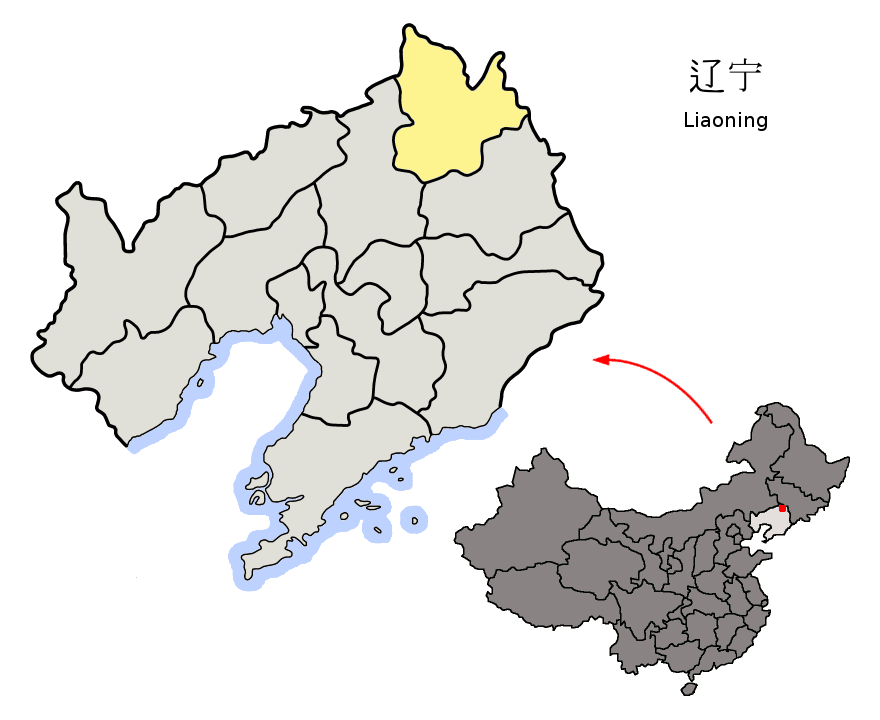
- Tieling in Liaoning
- Coordinates: 42°44′17″N 124°43′37″E
- Country: People's Republic of China
- Province: Liaoning
- Prefecture-level city: Tieling
- County seat: Xifeng Town (西丰镇)

Area
  - Total: 2,699 km^{2} (1,042 sq mi)
- Elevation: 199 m (653 ft)

Population (2020 census)
  - Total: 225,123
  - Density: 83.41/km^{2} (216.0/sq mi)
- Time zone: UTC+8 (China Standard)
- Postal code: 112400

Xifeng County (simplified Chinese: 西丰县; traditional Chinese: 西豐縣; pinyin: Xīfēng Xiàn) is a county in the northeast of Liaoning province, China, bordering Jilin to the north and east. It is under the administration of the prefecture-level city of Tieling, with an area of 2,699 square kilometres (1,042 sq mi) and a population of 225,123 in 2020.

== Administrative divisions ==
The county administers eight towns, four townships, and six ethnic townships.

Towns:

- Xifeng (西丰镇), Pinggang (平岗镇), Gaojiadian (郜家店镇), Anmin (安民镇), Zhenxing (振兴镇), Liangquan (凉泉镇), Tiande (天德镇), Fangmu (房木镇)

Townships:

- Taoran Township (陶然乡), Baiyu Township (柏榆乡), Diaoyu Township (钓鱼乡), Gengke Township (更刻乡), Mingde Manchu Ethnic Township (明德满族乡), Dexing Manchu Ethnic Township (德兴满族乡), Chengping Manchu Ethnic Township (成平满族乡), Helong Manchu Ethnic Township (和隆满族乡), Yingchang Manchu Ethnic Township (营厂满族乡), Jinxing Manchu Ethnic Township (金星满族乡)

== Climate ==
Climate data for Xifeng, elevation 196 m (643 ft), (1991–2020 normals, extremes 1981–2025)
Month	Jan	Feb	Mar	Apr	May	Jun	Jul	Aug	Sep	Oct	Nov	Dec	Year
Record high °C (°F)	6.0 (42.8)	14.7 (58.5)	24.3 (75.7)	30.5 (86.9)	34.5 (94.1)	36.7 (98.1)	36.1 (97.0)	35.5 (95.9)	31.6 (88.9)	28.5 (83.3)	21.6 (70.9)	12.3 (54.1)	36.7 (98.1)
Mean daily maximum °C (°F)	−6.8 (19.8)	−1.8 (28.8)	5.8 (42.4)	15.8 (60.4)	22.8 (73.0)	27.0 (80.6)	28.9 (84.0)	27.8 (82.0)	23.2 (73.8)	15.0 (59.0)	4.0 (39.2)	−4.7 (23.5)	13.1 (55.5)
Daily mean °C (°F)	−16.5 (2.3)	−11.1 (12.0)	−1.2 (29.8)	8.4 (47.1)	15.7 (60.3)	20.7 (69.3)	23.4 (74.1)	21.7 (71.1)	15.2 (59.4)	6.8 (44.2)	−3.0 (26.6)	−13.0 (8.6)	5.6 (42.1)
Mean daily minimum °C (°F)	−23.8 (−10.8)	−18.8 (−1.8)	−7.6 (18.3)	0.8 (33.4)	8.3 (46.9)	14.6 (58.3)	18.5 (65.3)	16.8 (62.2)	8.5 (47.3)	0.1 (32.2)	−8.9 (16.0)	−19.7 (−3.5)	−0.9 (30.3)
Record low °C (°F)	−43.4 (−46.1)	−39.8 (−39.6)	−29.5 (−21.1)	−12.4 (9.7)	−3.8 (25.2)	2.3 (36.1)	9.1 (48.4)	2.9 (37.2)	−3.9 (25.0)	−12.0 (10.4)	−28.5 (−19.3)	−38.0 (−36.4)	−43.4 (−46.1)
Average precipitation mm (inches)	5.8 (0.23)	8.4 (0.33)	15.4 (0.61)	34.0 (1.34)	64.3 (2.53)	108.7 (4.28)	178.9 (7.04)	183.7 (7.23)	55.1 (2.17)	35.2 (1.39)	22.1 (0.87)	9.2 (0.36)	720.8 (28.38)
Average precipitation days (≥ 0.1 mm)	5.0	4.1	5.8	7.4	10.6	13.6	14.7	13.5	8.2	8.0	6.6	6.0	103.5
Average snowy days	7.8	5.9	6.7	2.3	0	0	0	0	0	1.2	6.2	8.2	38.3
Average relative humidity (%)	69	65	60	54	58	70	81	84	78	72	70	71	69
Mean monthly sunshine hours	191.3	200.8	233.8	230.7	261.2	239.4	215.7	216.5	233.2	210.4	169.8	168.7	2,571.5
Percentage possible sunshine	65	67	63	57	57	52	47	51	63	62	59	60	59
Source: China Meteorological Administration
