= Yongji County, Jilin =

Yongji County 永吉县
- County
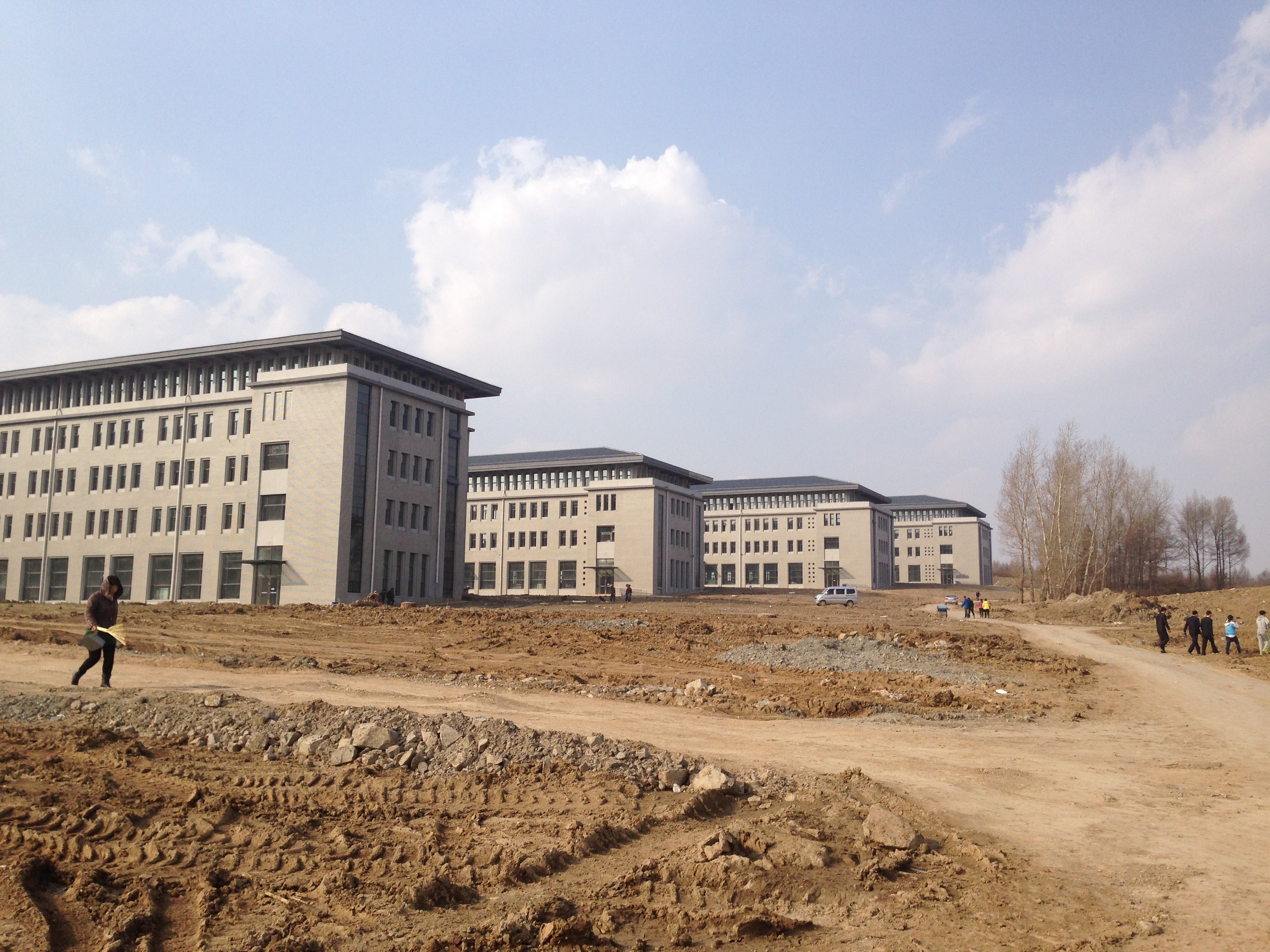

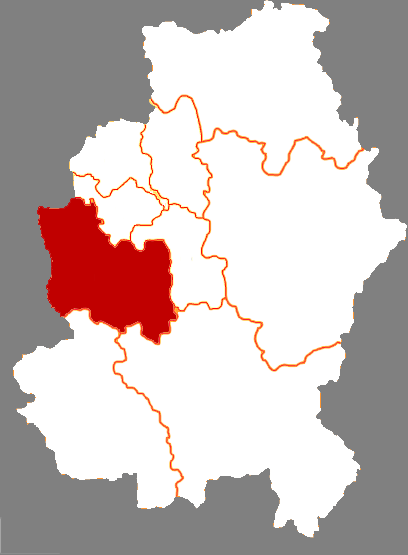
- Yongji in Jilin City

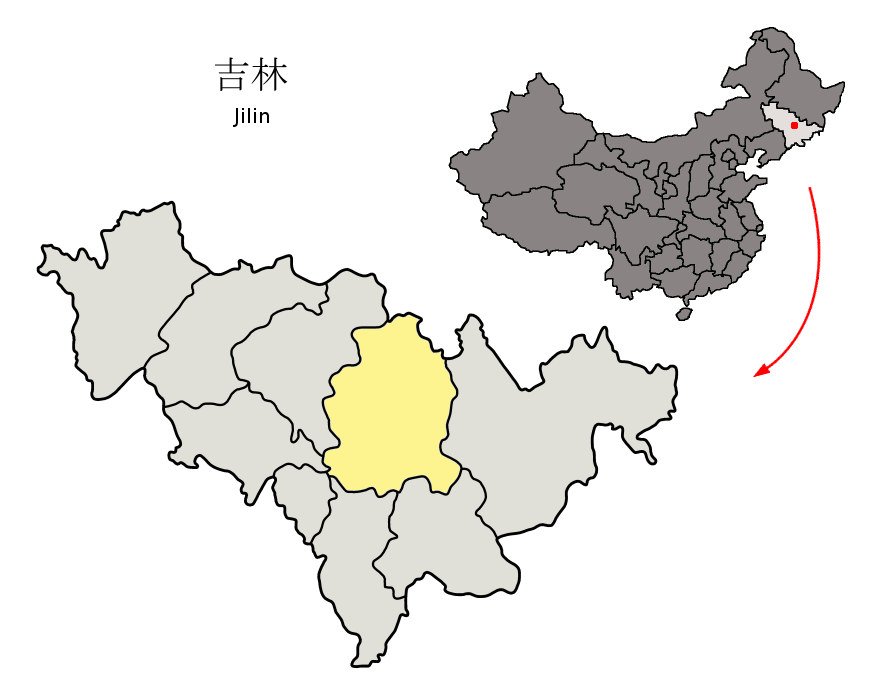
- Jilin City in Jilin Province
- Coordinates: 43°40′23″N 126°29′53″E
- Country: People's Republic of China
- Province: Jilin
- Prefecture-level city: Jilin City
- Seat: Kouqian (口前镇)

Area
  - Total: 2,625 km^{2} (1,014 sq mi)
- Elevation: 363 m (1,191 ft)

Population
  - Total: 400,000
  - Density: 150/km^{2} (390/sq mi)
- Time zone: UTC+8 (China Standard)
- Postal code: 132200

Yongji (Chinese: 永吉; pinyin: Yǒngjí; lit. 'always auspicious') is a county of central Jilin province, China, located just 18 km (11 mi) outside of Jilin City. It is under the administration of Jilin City, with a population of 400,000 residing in an area of 2,625 km^{2} (1,014 sq mi), and the county's seat is located in the town of Kouqian.

== 2010 floods ==
More than 30,000 people in the town of Kouqian were trapped by floodwaters in July 2010 when all communication routes to the area were snapped. 200 rescue workers were dispatched to rescue the inhabitants.

== Administrative divisions ==
As of 2011, the county administers seven towns and two townships.

Towns:

- Kouqian (口前镇)
- Shuanghe (双河镇)
- Chaluhe (岔路河镇)
- Xiyang (西阳镇)
- Wanchang (万昌镇)
- Beidahu (北大湖镇)
- Yilaxi (一拉溪镇)

Townships:

- Huangyu Township (黄榆乡)
- Jinjia Township (金家乡)

== Climate ==
Climate data for Yongji, elevation 230 m (750 ft), (1991–2020 normals, extremes 1981–2010)
Month	Jan	Feb	Mar	Apr	May	Jun	Jul	Aug	Sep	Oct	Nov	Dec	Year
Record high °C (°F)	5.5 (41.9)	12.7 (54.9)	19.9 (67.8)	29.8 (85.6)	33.8 (92.8)	36.4 (97.5)	37.8 (100.0)	35.0 (95.0)	30.7 (87.3)	27.6 (81.7)	21.5 (70.7)	11.3 (52.3)	37.8 (100.0)
Mean daily maximum °C (°F)	−8.1 (17.4)	−3.2 (26.2)	4.5 (40.1)	14.6 (58.3)	21.7 (71.1)	26.4 (79.5)	28.4 (83.1)	27.2 (81.0)	22.4 (72.3)	14.1 (57.4)	2.9 (37.2)	−5.8 (21.6)	12.1 (53.8)
Daily mean °C (°F)	−15.5 (4.1)	−10.4 (13.3)	−1.5 (29.3)	8.1 (46.6)	15.3 (59.5)	20.5 (68.9)	23.2 (73.8)	21.5 (70.7)	15.2 (59.4)	7.2 (45.0)	−2.8 (27.0)	−12.1 (10.2)	5.7 (42.3)
Mean daily minimum °C (°F)	−22.0 (−7.6)	−17.3 (0.9)	−7.4 (18.7)	1.6 (34.9)	8.9 (48.0)	14.9 (58.8)	18.3 (64.9)	16.8 (62.2)	8.8 (47.8)	0.9 (33.6)	−8.3 (17.1)	−18.1 (−0.6)	−0.2 (31.6)
Record low °C (°F)	−40.4 (−40.7)	−36.9 (−34.4)	−30.1 (−22.2)	−12.2 (10.0)	−4.3 (24.3)	3.7 (38.7)	8.7 (47.7)	6.1 (43.0)	−3.9 (25.0)	−12.6 (9.3)	−26.7 (−16.1)	−36.0 (−32.8)	−40.4 (−40.7)
Average precipitation mm (inches)	6.5 (0.26)	9.1 (0.36)	17.0 (0.67)	33.4 (1.31)	68.2 (2.69)	120.2 (4.73)	184.9 (7.28)	162.2 (6.39)	67.2 (2.65)	37.9 (1.49)	23.4 (0.92)	10.9 (0.43)	740.9 (29.18)
Average precipitation days (≥ 0.1 mm)	6.5	5.7	7.7	8.2	12.7	14.5	14.4	14.3	9.4	9.1	7.8	7.3	117.6
Average snowy days	10.5	7.7	9.3	3.1	0.1	0	0	0	0	2.5	8.3	10.9	52.4
Average relative humidity (%)	66	62	57	51	58	68	79	82	75	65	65	67	66
Mean monthly sunshine hours	146.6	170.0	201.1	204.7	228.7	231.2	216.1	211.9	219.3	184.0	145.2	131.6	2,290.4
Percentage possible sunshine	51	57	54	51	50	50	47	50	59	55	51	48	52
Source: China Meteorological Administration

Climate data for Beidahu, Jilin, elevation 537 m (1,762 ft), (1991–2020 normals)
Month	Jan	Feb	Mar	Apr	May	Jun	Jul	Aug	Sep	Oct	Nov	Dec	Year
Mean daily maximum °C (°F)	−9.2 (15.4)	−5.1 (22.8)	2.4 (36.3)	12.0 (53.6)	19.7 (67.5)	24.1 (75.4)	26.3 (79.3)	25.2 (77.4)	20.2 (68.4)	12.3 (54.1)	1.2 (34.2)	−7.4 (18.7)	10.1 (50.3)
Daily mean °C (°F)	−15.0 (5.0)	−10.9 (12.4)	−2.7 (27.1)	6.5 (43.7)	13.9 (57.0)	18.6 (65.5)	21.5 (70.7)	20.3 (68.5)	14.6 (58.3)	6.9 (44.4)	−3.7 (25.3)	−12.5 (9.5)	4.8 (40.6)
Mean daily minimum °C (°F)	−19.9 (−3.8)	−16.3 (2.7)	−8.2 (17.2)	0.8 (33.4)	8.3 (46.9)	13.7 (56.7)	17.4 (63.3)	16.2 (61.2)	9.4 (48.9)	1.5 (34.7)	−8.3 (17.1)	−17.4 (0.7)	−0.2 (31.6)
Average precipitation mm (inches)	11.1 (0.44)	21.5 (0.85)	34.9 (1.37)	52.9 (2.08)	110.5 (4.35)	125.2 (4.93)	235.2 (9.26)	211.2 (8.31)	96.4 (3.80)	51.4 (2.02)	43.7 (1.72)	21.2 (0.83)	1,015.2 (39.96)
Average precipitation days (≥ 0.1 mm)	9.1	9.1	9.7	9.7	13.9	15.6	15.5	14.9	10.2	9.2	10.6	12.3	139.8
Average snowy days	13.2	11.7	12.2	5.4	0.4	0	0	0	0.1	3.1	11.1	15.3	72.5
Average relative humidity (%)	65	59	57	51	58	69	78	79	73	59	66	67	65
Mean monthly sunshine hours	113.5	133.1	161.9	163.8	180.1	178.7	184.5	180.8	188.8	163.6	104.0	90.3	1,843.1
Percentage possible sunshine	39	45	44	41	39	39	40	42	51	49	36	33	42
Source: China Meteorological Administration
