= Liaoyang County =

Liaoyang 辽阳县
- County
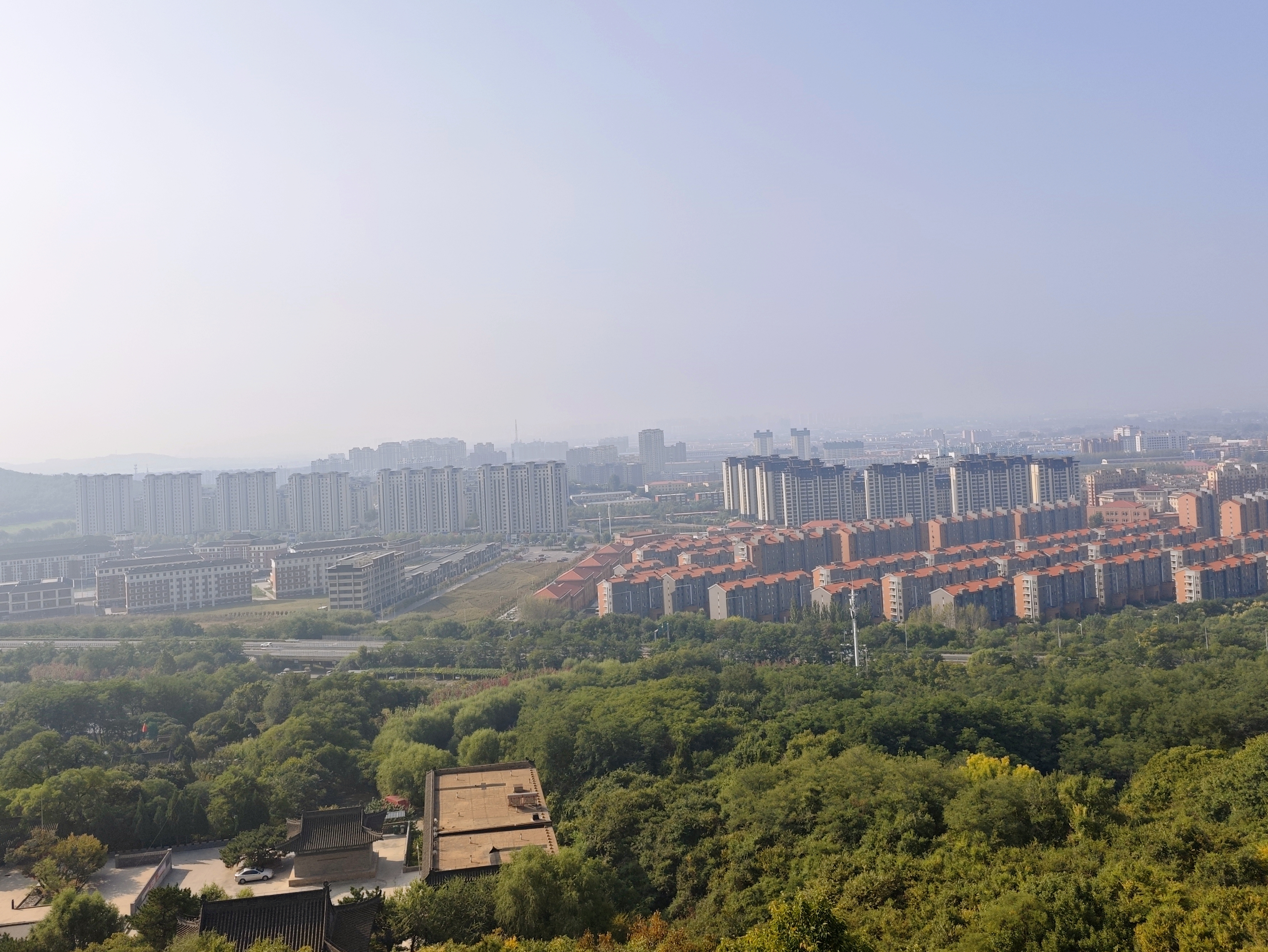

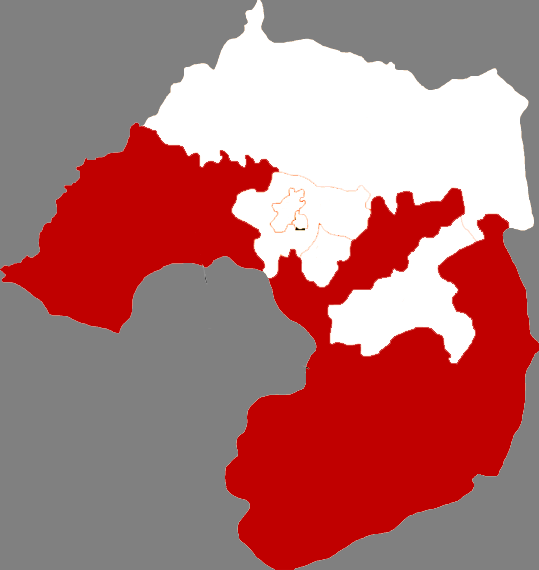
- Location in Liaoyang

- Location in Liaoning
- Coordinates: 41°12′N 123°06′E
- Country: People's Republic of China
- Province: Liaoning
- Prefecture-level city: Liaoyang

Area
  - Total: 2,443 km^{2} (943 sq mi)
- Elevation: 75 m (246 ft)

Population (2020 census)
  - Total: 372,131
  - Density: 152.3/km^{2} (394.5/sq mi)
- Time zone: UTC+8 (China Standard)

Liaoyang County (simplified Chinese: 辽阳县; traditional Chinese: 遼陽縣; pinyin: Liáoyáng Xiàn) is a county in east-central Liaoning province in Northeast China. It is under the administration of Liaoyang City, located in between the urban area of Liaoyang City and Anshan City.

== Administrative divisions ==
There are 14 towns, one township, and three townships in the county.

Towns:

- Shoushan (首山镇), Mujia (穆家镇), Lanjia (兰家镇), Liuhao (柳壕镇), Xiaotun (小屯镇), Shaling (沙岭镇), Bahui (八会镇), Tangmazhai (唐马寨镇), Hanling (寒岭镇), Helan (河栏镇), Xiaobeihe (小北河镇), Liu'erbao (刘二堡镇), Huangniwa (黄泥洼镇), Longchang (隆昌镇)

Townships:

- Xiadahe Township (下达河乡), Tianshui Manchu Ethnic Township (甜水满族乡), Jidongyu Manchu Ethnic Township (吉洞峪满族乡)

== Climate ==
Climate data for Liaoyang County, elevation 30 m (98 ft), (1991–2020 normals)
Month	Jan	Feb	Mar	Apr	May	Jun	Jul	Aug	Sep	Oct	Nov	Dec	Year
Mean daily maximum °C (°F)	−3.6 (25.5)	1.0 (33.8)	8.2 (46.8)	17.5 (63.5)	24.3 (75.7)	27.9 (82.2)	29.8 (85.6)	29.0 (84.2)	24.9 (76.8)	17.1 (62.8)	6.9 (44.4)	−1.1 (30.0)	15.2 (59.3)
Daily mean °C (°F)	−9.3 (15.3)	−4.5 (23.9)	2.8 (37.0)	11.7 (53.1)	18.5 (65.3)	22.8 (73.0)	25.4 (77.7)	24.3 (75.7)	18.8 (65.8)	11.1 (52.0)	1.7 (35.1)	−6.4 (20.5)	9.7 (49.5)
Mean daily minimum °C (°F)	−14.3 (6.3)	−9.6 (14.7)	−2.3 (27.9)	5.8 (42.4)	12.8 (55.0)	17.8 (64.0)	21.2 (70.2)	20 (68)	13.4 (56.1)	5.6 (42.1)	−3.1 (26.4)	−11.1 (12.0)	4.7 (40.4)
Average precipitation mm (inches)	5.7 (0.22)	7.8 (0.31)	14.2 (0.56)	34.3 (1.35)	61.7 (2.43)	93.5 (3.68)	158.1 (6.22)	181.7 (7.15)	57.8 (2.28)	44.4 (1.75)	25.2 (0.99)	9.9 (0.39)	694.3 (27.33)
Average precipitation days (≥ 0.1 mm)	3.1	3.2	4.2	6.7	9.2	11.1	12.0	11.1	7.2	6.6	5.6	3.8	83.8
Average snowy days	4.4	3.9	3.8	0.8	0	0	0	0	0	0.3	3.9	4.9	22
Average relative humidity (%)	60	55	51	48	52	64	75	77	69	63	61	62	61
Mean monthly sunshine hours	193.2	195.7	231.1	229.9	261.3	224.6	187.5	205.4	232.0	210.9	176.5	177.4	2,525.5
Percentage possible sunshine	65	65	62	57	58	50	41	49	63	62	60	62	58
Source: China Meteorological Administration
