= Kangping County =

Kangping 康平县
- County
- Location in Liaoning
- Coordinates: 42°44′38″N 123°21′04″E
- Country: People's Republic of China
- Province: Liaoning
- Sub-provincial city: Shenyang

Area
  - Total: 2,161 km^{2} (834 sq mi)

Population (2020)
  - Total: 278,384
  - Density: 128.8/km^{2} (333.6/sq mi)
- Time zone: UTC+8 (China Standard)
- Postal code: 1105XX

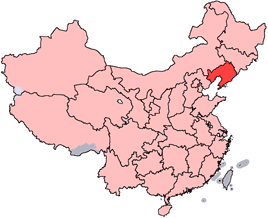
Location of Kangping county, in China.

Kangping County (simplified Chinese: 康平县; traditional Chinese: 康平縣; pinyin: Kāngpíng Xiàn) is a county of Liaoning Province, Northeast China. It is under the administration of the prefecture-level city of Shenyang, the capital of Liaoning, bordering Inner Mongolia to the northwest, and is 104 km (65 mi) north of downtown Shenyang. As of 2020, it has a population of 278,384 residing in an area of 2,173 km^{2} (839 sq mi). It lies just off of G25 Changchun–Shenzhen Expressway, and is the northernmost county-level division of Shenyang City, bordering Faku County to the south as well as the prefecture-level cities of Tieling to the east, Fuxin to the west, and Tongliao (Inner Mongolia) to the north.

== Administrative divisions ==
The county includes seven towns, four townships, and four ethnic townships.

Towns:

- Kangping (康平镇)
- Dongguantun (东关屯镇)
- Zhangqiang (张强镇)
- Xiaochengzi (小城子镇)
- Fangjiatun (方家屯镇)
- Haoguantun (郝官屯镇)
- Erniusuokou (二牛所口镇)

Townships:

- Liangjiazi Township (两家子乡)
- Beisijiazi Township (北四家子乡)
- Shandongtun Township (山东屯乡)
- Haizhouwobao Township (海洲窝堡乡)
- Shajintai Mongol and Manchu Ethnic Township (沙金台蒙古族满族乡)
- Liushutun Mongol and Manchu Ethnic Township (柳树屯蒙古族满族乡)
- Dongsheng Manchu and Mongol Ethnic Township (东升满族蒙古族乡)
- Xiguantun Manchu and Mongol Ethnic Township (西关屯满族蒙古族乡)

== Climate ==
Climate data for Kangping, elevation 87 m (285 ft), (1991–2020 normals, extremes 1981–2010)
Month	Jan	Feb	Mar	Apr	May	Jun	Jul	Aug	Sep	Oct	Nov	Dec	Year
Record high °C (°F)	6.0 (42.8)	16.9 (62.4)	20.6 (69.1)	30.7 (87.3)	34.9 (94.8)	37.5 (99.5)	36.6 (97.9)	36.2 (97.2)	32.9 (91.2)	28.1 (82.6)	20.3 (68.5)	12.1 (53.8)	37.5 (99.5)
Mean daily maximum °C (°F)	−6.3 (20.7)	−1.0 (30.2)	6.5 (43.7)	16.3 (61.3)	23.5 (74.3)	27.3 (81.1)	28.9 (84.0)	27.9 (82.2)	23.8 (74.8)	15.4 (59.7)	4.2 (39.6)	−4.3 (24.3)	13.5 (56.3)
Daily mean °C (°F)	−11.8 (10.8)	−6.9 (19.6)	0.8 (33.4)	10.2 (50.4)	17.5 (63.5)	22.1 (71.8)	24.4 (75.9)	23.1 (73.6)	17.7 (63.9)	9.5 (49.1)	−0.8 (30.6)	−9.3 (15.3)	8.0 (46.5)
Mean daily minimum °C (°F)	−16.5 (2.3)	−12.0 (10.4)	−4.4 (24.1)	4.3 (39.7)	11.8 (53.2)	17.1 (62.8)	20.4 (68.7)	18.9 (66.0)	12.1 (53.8)	4.2 (39.6)	−5.3 (22.5)	−13.7 (7.3)	3.1 (37.5)
Record low °C (°F)	−32.6 (−26.7)	−28.5 (−19.3)	−17.7 (0.1)	−8.6 (16.5)	−0.1 (31.8)	6.2 (43.2)	12.4 (54.3)	7.4 (45.3)	0.3 (32.5)	−8.8 (16.2)	−20.2 (−4.4)	−30.3 (−22.5)	−32.6 (−26.7)
Average precipitation mm (inches)	2.6 (0.10)	4.3 (0.17)	9.9 (0.39)	21.5 (0.85)	50.0 (1.97)	82.1 (3.23)	130.4 (5.13)	143.8 (5.66)	35.5 (1.40)	28.0 (1.10)	13.2 (0.52)	4.3 (0.17)	525.6 (20.69)
Average precipitation days (≥ 0.1 mm)	2.6	2.2	3.6	5.3	8.8	11.4	10.9	9.8	6.2	5.4	3.7	3.3	73.2
Average snowy days	3.9	3.5	3.7	1.4	0	0	0	0	0	0.8	3.6	4.5	21.4
Average relative humidity (%)	58	51	46	44	49	64	77	78	66	58	59	60	59
Mean monthly sunshine hours	204.4	211.4	250.9	246.8	266.4	245.6	223.1	229.7	240.0	225.5	184.2	182.3	2,710.3
Percentage possible sunshine	70	70	68	61	59	54	48	54	65	67	64	65	62
Source: China Meteorological Administration
