= Chengde (disambiguation) =

Chengde (承德市) is a prefecture-level city in Hebei, China.

Chengde may also refer to:

- Chengde County (承德县/承德縣), in Chengde, Hebei, China
- Chengde (Tang dynasty) (成德), an independent Chinese polity in the mid-700s CE

== See also ==
- Changde
- Chengdu
