= Kuancheng =

Kuancheng may refer to:

- Kuancheng Manchu Autonomous County, in Hebei, China
- Kuancheng District, in Changchun, Jilin, China
