= Banbishan =

Banbishan 半壁山镇
- Town
- Bànbìshān Zhèn
- Location in Hebei Location in China
- Coordinates: 40°22′12″N 117°55′54″E
- Country: People's Republic of China
- Province: Hebei
- Prefecture-level city: Chengde
- County: Xinglong

Area
  - Total: 125.8 km^{2} (48.6 sq mi)

Population (2010)
  - Total: 22,029
  - Density: 175.1/km^{2} (454/sq mi)
- Time zone: UTC+8 (China Standard)

Banbishan (Chinese: 半壁山镇; pinyin: Bànbìshān Zhèn) is a town located in Xinglong County, Chengde, Hebei, China. According to the 2010 census, Banbishan had a population of 22,029, including 11,180 males and 10,849 females. The population was distributed as follows: 4,195 people aged under 14, 16,270 people aged between 15 and 64, and 1,564 people aged over 65.

== See also ==
- List of township-level divisions of Hebei
