= Gaositai =

Gaositai 高寺台镇
- Town
- Gāosìtái Zhèn
- Location in Hebei Location in China
- Coordinates: 41°09′09″N 117°57′32″E
- Country: People's Republic of China
- Province: Hebei
- Prefecture-level city: Chengde
- County: Chengde

Area
  - Total: 141.6 km^{2} (54.7 sq mi)

Population (2010)
  - Total: 13,032
  - Density: 92.06/km^{2} (238.4/sq mi)
- Time zone: UTC+8 (China Standard)

Gaositai (Chinese: 高寺台镇; pinyin: Gāosìtái Zhèn) is a town located in Chengde County, Chengde, Hebei, China. According to the 2010 census, Gaositai had a population of 13,032, including 6,880 males and 6,152 females. The population was distributed as follows: 2,130 people aged under 14, 9,699 people aged between 15 and 64, and 1,203 people aged over 65.

== See also ==
- List of township-level divisions of Hebei
