= Dashimiao =

Dashimiao 大石庙镇
- Town
- Dàshímiào Zhèn
- Location in Hebei Location in China
- Coordinates: 40°55′05″N 117°57′09″E
- Country: People's Republic of China
- Province: Hebei
- Prefecture-level city: Chengde
- District: Shuangqiao

Area
  - Total: 107.2 km^{2} (41.4 sq mi)

Population (2010)
  - Total: 34,621
  - Density: 323.1/km^{2} (837/sq mi)
- Time zone: UTC+8 (China Standard)

Dashimiao (Chinese: 大石庙镇; pinyin: Dàshímiào Zhèn) is a town located in Shuangqiao District, Chengde, Hebei, China. According to the 2010 census, Dashimiao had a population of 34,621, including 18,169 males and 16,452 females. The population was distributed as follows: 5,902 people aged under 14, 26,614 people aged between 15 and 64, and 2,105 people aged over 65.

== See also ==
- List of township-level divisions of Hebei
