= Cangzi Township =

Cangzi Township 仓子乡
- Rural Township
- Cāngzi Xiāng
- Location in Hebei Location in China
- Coordinates: 41°00′46″N 118°05′14″E
- Country: People's Republic of China
- Province: Hebei
- Prefecture-level city: Chengde
- County: Chengde

Area
  - Total: 109.9 km^{2} (42.4 sq mi)

Population (2010)
  - Total: 10,062
  - Density: 91.57/km^{2} (237.2/sq mi)
- Time zone: UTC+8 (China Standard)

Cangzi Township (Chinese: 仓子乡; pinyin: Cāngzi Xiāng) is a rural township located in Chengde County, Chengde, Hebei, China. According to the 2010 census, Cangzi Township had a population of 10,062, including 5,254 males and 4,808 females. The population was distributed as follows: 1,651 people aged under 14, 7,406 people aged between 15 and 64, and 1,005 people aged over 65.

== See also ==
- List of township-level divisions of Hebei
