= Bajia Township =

Bajia Township 八家乡
- Rural Township
- Bājiā Xiāng
- Location in Hebei Location in China
- Coordinates: 40°39′39″N 118°16′05″E
- Country: People's Republic of China
- Province: Hebei
- Prefecture-level city: Chengde
- County: Chengde

Area
  - Total: 136.9 km^{2} (52.9 sq mi)

Population (2010)
  - Total: 8,519
  - Density: 62.21/km^{2} (161.1/sq mi)
- Time zone: UTC+8 (China Standard)

Bajia Township (Chinese: 八家乡; pinyin: Bājiā Xiāng) is a rural township located in Chengde County, Chengde, Hebei, China. According to the 2010 census, Bajia Township had a population of 8,519, including 4,428 males and 4,091 females. The population was distributed as follows: 1,372 people aged under 14, 6,536 people aged between 15 and 64, and 611 people aged over 65.

== See also ==
- List of township-level divisions of Hebei
