= Beiyingfang =

Beiyingfang 北营房镇
- Town
- Běiyíngfáng Zhèn
- Location in Hebei Location in China
- Coordinates: 40°34′25″N 117°40′18″E
- Country: People's Republic of China
- Province: Hebei
- Prefecture-level city: Chengde
- County: Xinglong

Area
  - Total: 123.0 km^{2} (47.5 sq mi)

Population (2010)
  - Total: 12,403
  - Density: 100.8/km^{2} (261/sq mi)
- Time zone: UTC+8 (China Standard)

Beiyingfang (Chinese: 北营房镇; pinyin: Běiyíngfáng Zhèn) is a town located in Xinglong County, Chengde, Hebei, China. According to the 2010 census, Beiyingfang had a population of 12,403, including 6,372 males and 6,031 females. The population was distributed as follows: 1,891 people aged under 14, 9,380 people aged between 15 and 64, and 1,132 people aged over 65.

== See also ==
- List of township-level divisions of Hebei
