= Dushigou Township =

Dushigou Township 独石沟乡 ᡩᡠ ᡧᡳ ᡤᡝᠣᡡ ᡤᠠᡧᠠᠨ
- Rural Township
- Pinyin: Dúshígōu Xiāng; Möllendorff: Du ši goū Gašan
- Location in Hebei Location in China
- Coordinates: 40°28′35″N 118°16′05″E
- Country: People's Republic of China
- Province: Hebei
- Prefecture-level city: Chengde
- Autonomous county: Kuancheng

Area
  - Total: 84.10 km^{2} (32.47 sq mi)

Population (2010)
  - Total: 1,204
  - Density: 14.32/km^{2} (37.1/sq mi)
- Time zone: UTC+8 (China Standard)

Dushigou Township (Chinese: 独石沟乡; pinyin: Dúshígōu Xiāng), (Manchu: ᡩᡠ
ᡧᡳ
ᡤᡝᠣᡡ
ᡤᠠᡧᠠᠨ; Möllendorff romanization: du ši goū gašan) is a rural township located in Kuancheng Manchu Autonomous County, Chengde, Hebei, China. According to the 2010 census, Dushigou Township had a population of 1,204, including 614 males and 590 females. The population was distributed as follows: 205 people aged under 14, 881 people aged between 15 and 64, and 118 people aged over 65.

== See also ==
- List of township-level divisions of Hebei
