= Chengde Puning Airport =

Airport in Hebei, north China

Chengde Puning Airport 承德普宁机场
- IATA: CDE; ICAO: ZBCD

Summary
- Airport type: Public
- Serves: Chengde
- Location: Chengde, Hebei, China
- Opened: May 31, 2017; 9 years ago
- Coordinates: 41°07′21″N 118°04′26″E

Map
- Location of airport in Hebei

Runways
Direction	Length		Surface
Direction	m	ft	Surface
12/30	2,800	9,186

Statistics (2021)
- Passengers: 294,900
- Aircraft movements: 2,583
- Cargo (metric tons): 108.5

Chengde Puning Airport
- Simplified Chinese: 承德普宁机场
- Traditional Chinese: 承德普寧機場
Transcriptions
Standard Mandarin
- Hanyu Pinyin: Chéngdé Pǔníng Jīchǎng

Chengde Puning Airport (IATA: CDE, ICAO: ZBCD) is an airport serving the city of Chengde in Hebei province, north China. It is located 19.5 kilometres (12.1 mi) northeast of the city center in Tougou Town, Chengde County. Construction began on March 25, 2011 at an estimated cost of 1.5 billion yuan. The airport was opened on May 31, 2017.

== Airlines and destinations ==
Airlines	Destinations
9 Air	Guangzhou, Wuhan
China Express Airlines	Chengdu–Tianfu, Shijiazhuang
Hebei Airlines	Hangzhou, Shijiazhuang

== See also ==
- List of airports in China
- List of the busiest airports in China
