= Bagualing Manchu Ethnic Township =

Bagualing Manchu Ethnic Township 八卦岭满族乡 ᠪᠠᡤᡠ ᠯᡳᠩ ᠮᠠᠨᠵᡠ ᡠᡴᠰᡠᡵᠠᡳ ᡤᠠᡧᠠᠨ
- Rural Township
- Pinyin: Bāguàlǐng Mǎnzú Xiāng; Möllendorff: Bagu ling Manju Uksurai Gašan
- Location in Hebei Location in China
- Coordinates: 40°15′03″N 117°43′47″E
- Country: People's Republic of China
- Province: Hebei
- Prefecture-level city: Chengde
- County: Xinglong

Area
  - Total: 105.2 km^{2} (40.6 sq mi)

Population (2010)
  - Total: 14,945
  - Density: 142.1/km^{2} (368/sq mi)
- Time zone: UTC+8 (China Standard)

Bagualing Manchu Ethnic Township (Chinese: 八卦岭满族乡; pinyin: Bāguàlǐng Mǎnzú Xiāng), Manchu: ᠪᠠᡤᡠ
ᠯᡳᠩ
ᠮᠠᠨᠵᡠ
ᡠᡴᠰᡠᡵᠠᡳ
ᡤᠠᡧᠠᠨ, Möllendorff romanization: bagu ling manju uksurai gašan) is a rural township located in Xinglong County, Chengde, Hebei, China. According to the 2010 census, Bagualing Manchu Ethnic Township had a population of 14,945, including 7,591 males and 7,354 females. The population was distributed as follows: 3,110 people aged under 14, 10,795 people aged between 15 and 64, and 1,040 people aged over 65.

== See also ==
- List of township-level divisions of Hebei
