= Bancheng, Kuancheng County =

Bancheng 板城 ᠪᠠᠨ ᠴᡝᠩ
- Town
- 板城 ᠪᠠᠨ ᠴᡝᠩ; Pinyin: Bǎnchéng; Möllendorff: Ban ceng
- Location in Hebei Location in China
- Coordinates: 40°36′00″N 118°38′25″E
- Country: People's Republic of China
- Province: Hebei
- Prefecture-level city: Chengde
- Autonomous county: Kuancheng

Area
  - Total: 164.1 km^{2} (63.4 sq mi)

Population (2010)
  - Total: 21,468
  - Density: 130.9/km^{2} (339/sq mi)
- Time zone: UTC+8 (China Standard)

Bancheng (Chinese: 板城镇; pinyin: Bǎnchéng Zhèn), Manchu: ᠪᠠᠨ
ᠴᡝᠩ
ᡴᠠᡩᠠᠯᠠᠩᡤᠠ

; Möllendorff romanization: ban ceng kadalangga) is a town located in Kuancheng Manchu Autonomous County, Chengde, Hebei, China. According to the 2010 census, Bancheng had a population of 21,468, including 11,153 males and 10,315 females. The population was distributed as follows: 3,883 people aged under 14, 15,850 people aged between 15 and 64, and 1,735 people aged over 65.

== See also ==
- List of township-level divisions of Hebei
