= Jinshanling =

Section of the Great Wall of China

Coordinates: 40°40′35″N 117°14′40″E

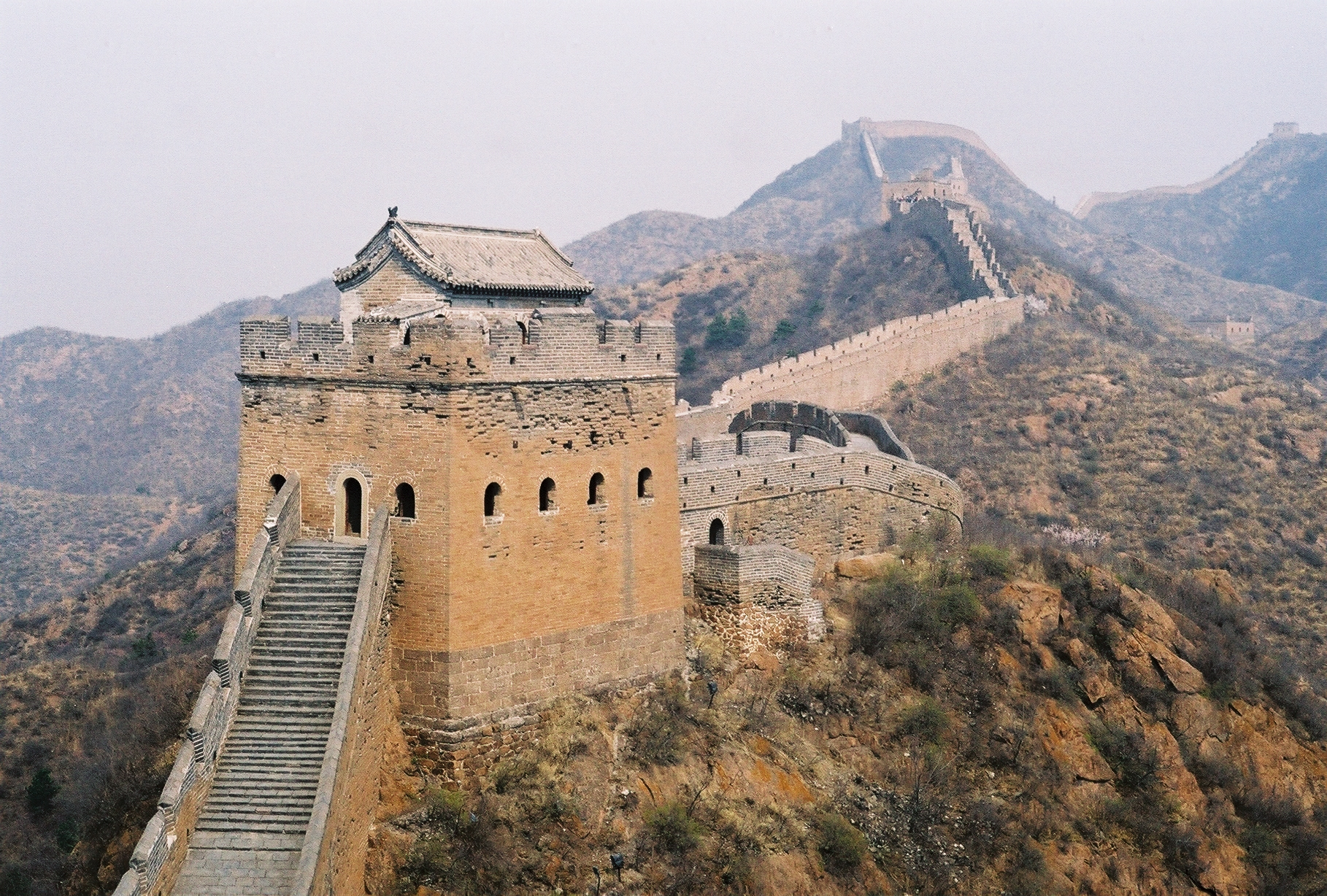
Jinshanling, Great Wall of China

Jinshanling (simplified Chinese: 金山岭; traditional Chinese: 金山嶺; pinyin: Jīnshānlǐng) is a section of the Great Wall of China located in the mountainous area in Luanping County, Chengde, Hebei Province, 125 km (78 miles) northeast of Beijing. This section of the wall is connected with the Simatai section to the east. Some distance to the west lies the Mutianyu section. Jinshanling was built from 1570 CE during the Ming dynasty.

== Description ==
The Jinshanling section of the Great Wall is 10.5 km (6.5 miles) long with 5 passes, 67 towers and 3 beacon towers. The initial section of the wall has been restored to original condition, but the condition of the wall deteriorates towards its natural state as it approaches Simatai. The entrance fee is 65 RMB. A cable car (40 RMB) has been constructed to take visitors to the highest point along the wall. There is an additional admission charge of 50 RMB to continue on to the Simatai section, and a 5 RMB fee to cross the suspension bridge.

== Gallery ==
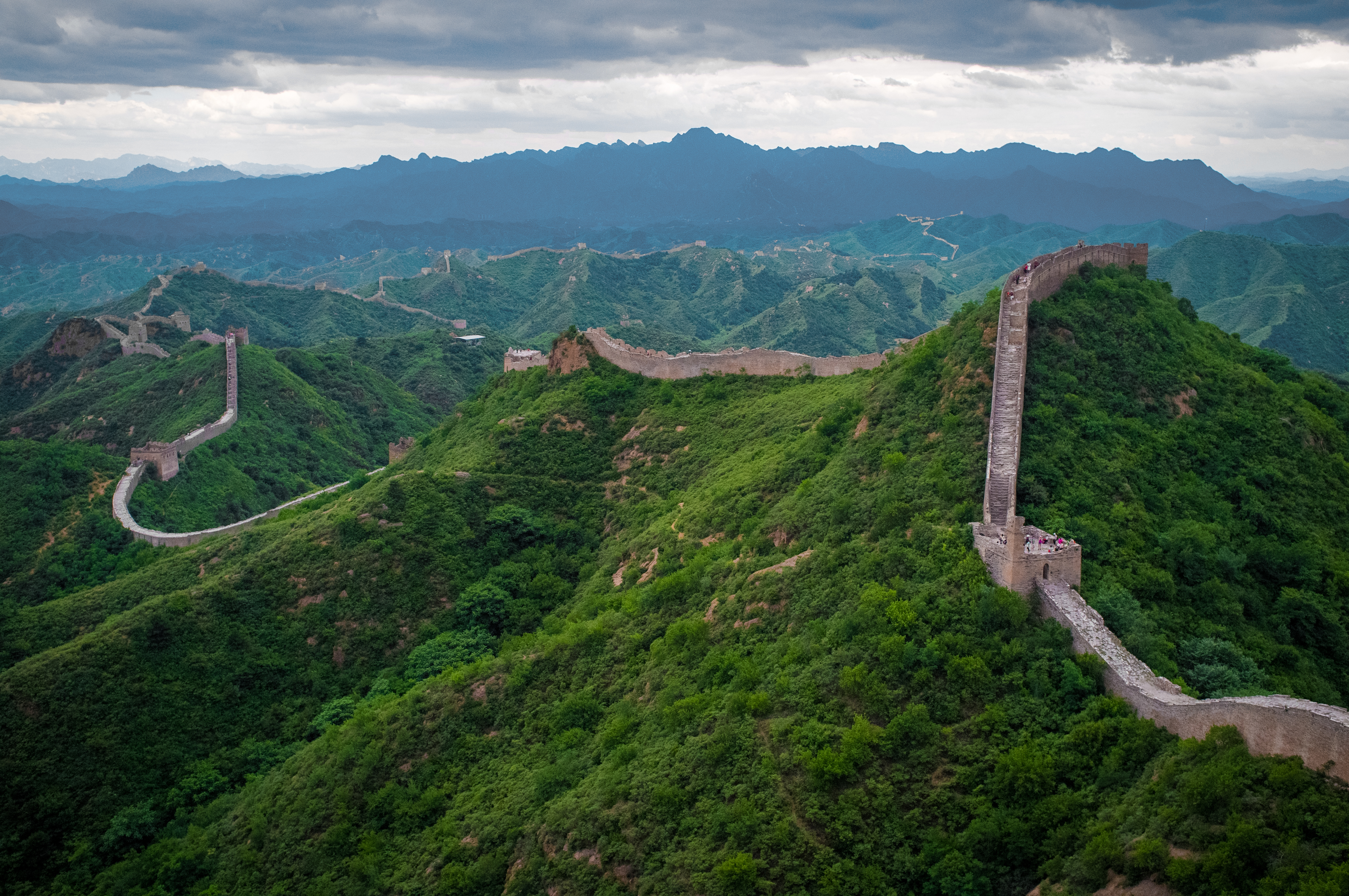
Jinshanling

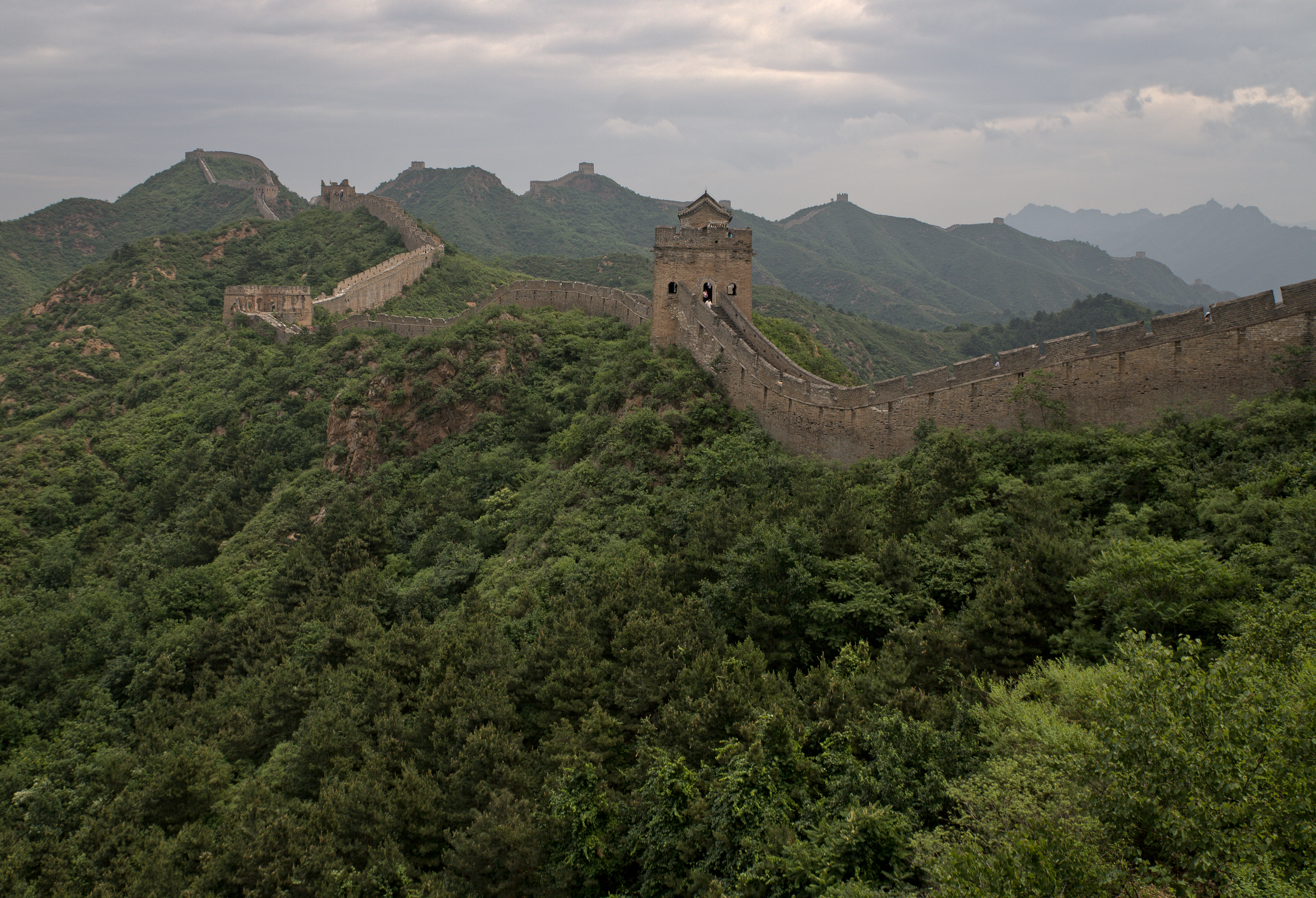
View of Great Wall at Jinshanling, in the early morning

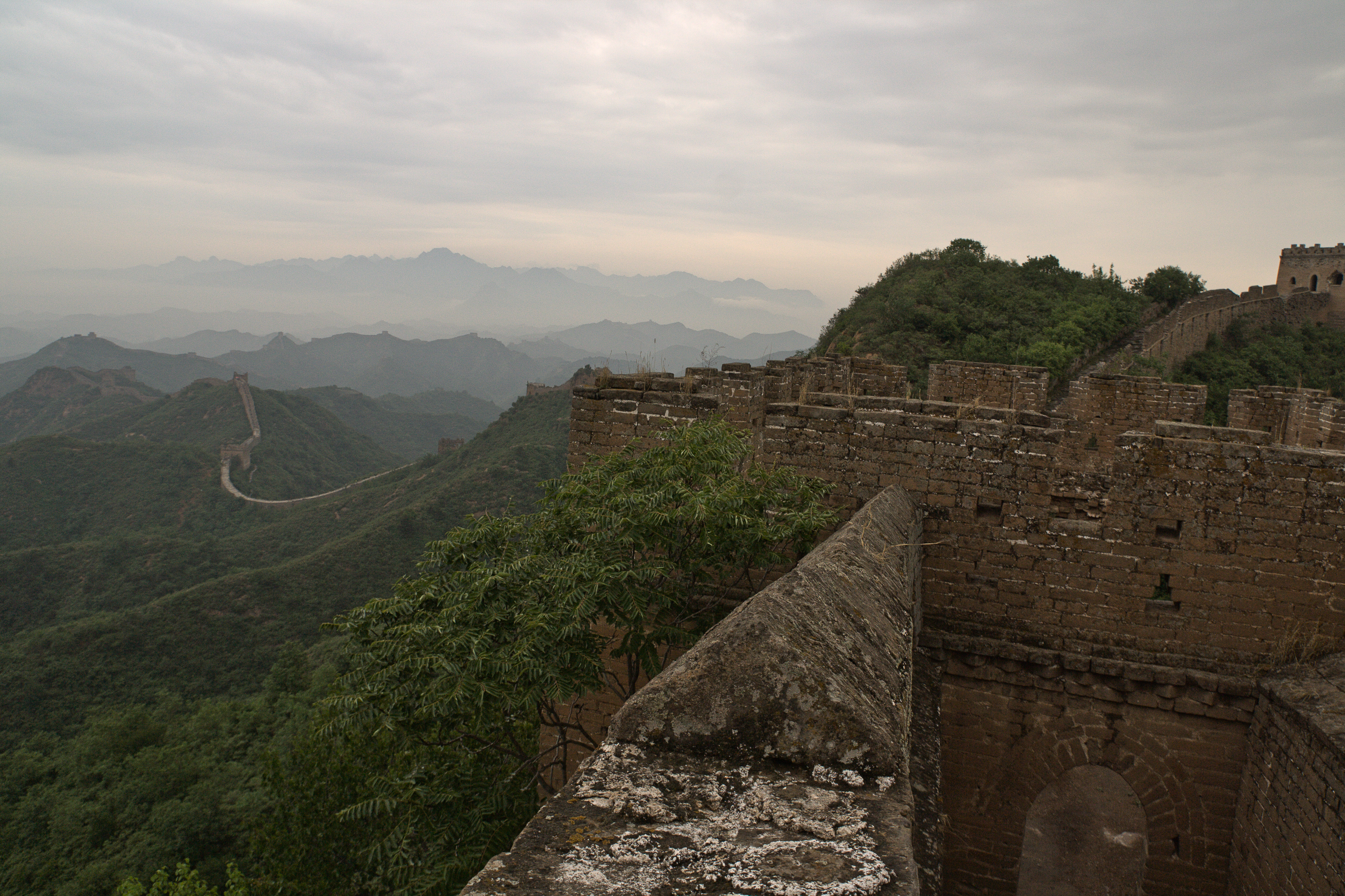
Jinshanling

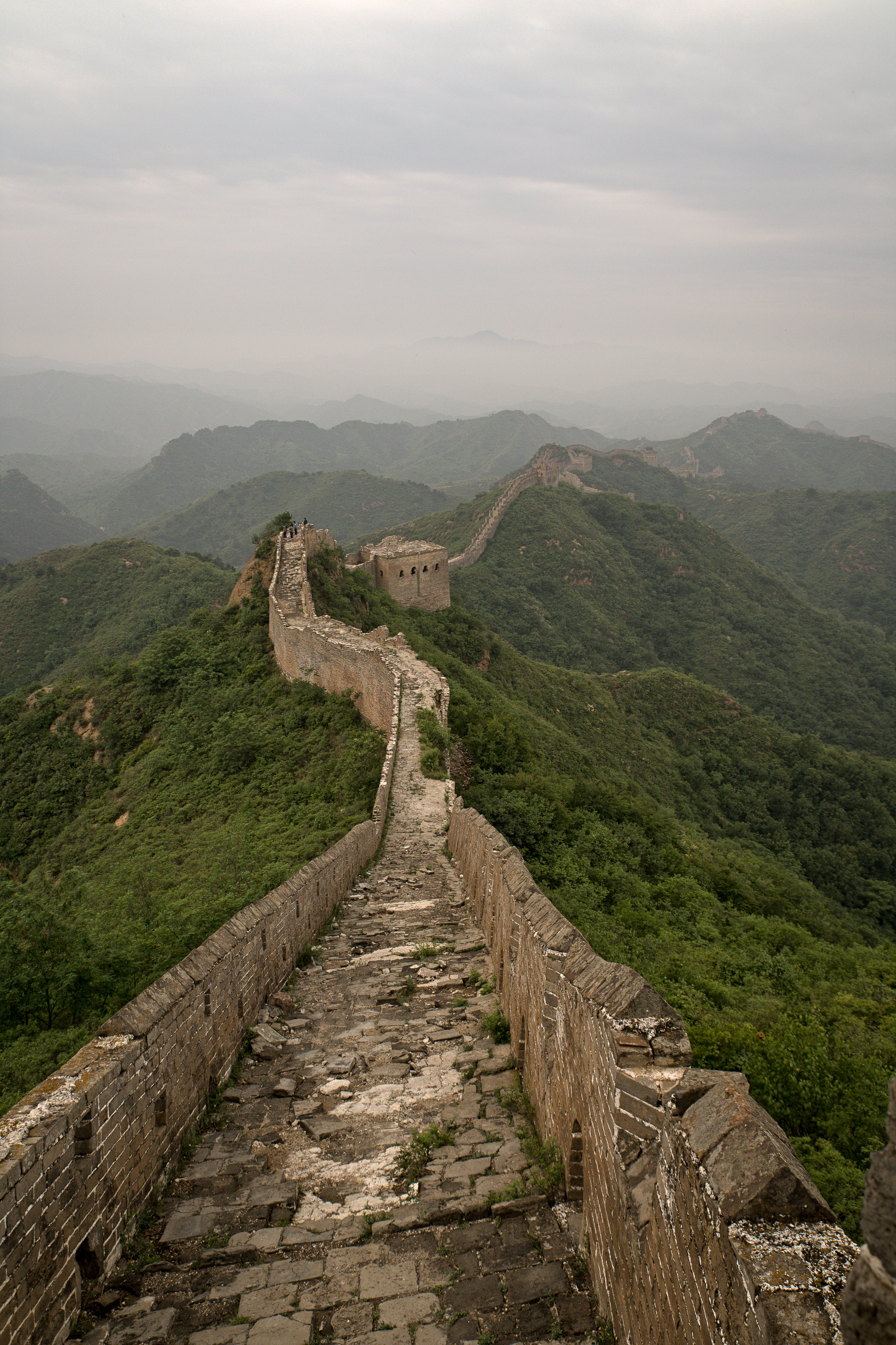
Jinshanling section of the Great Wall of China

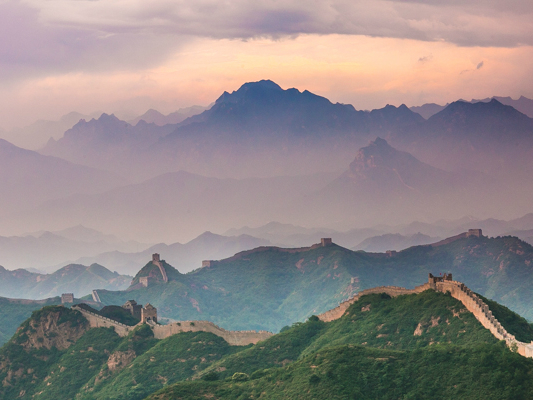
Jinshanling

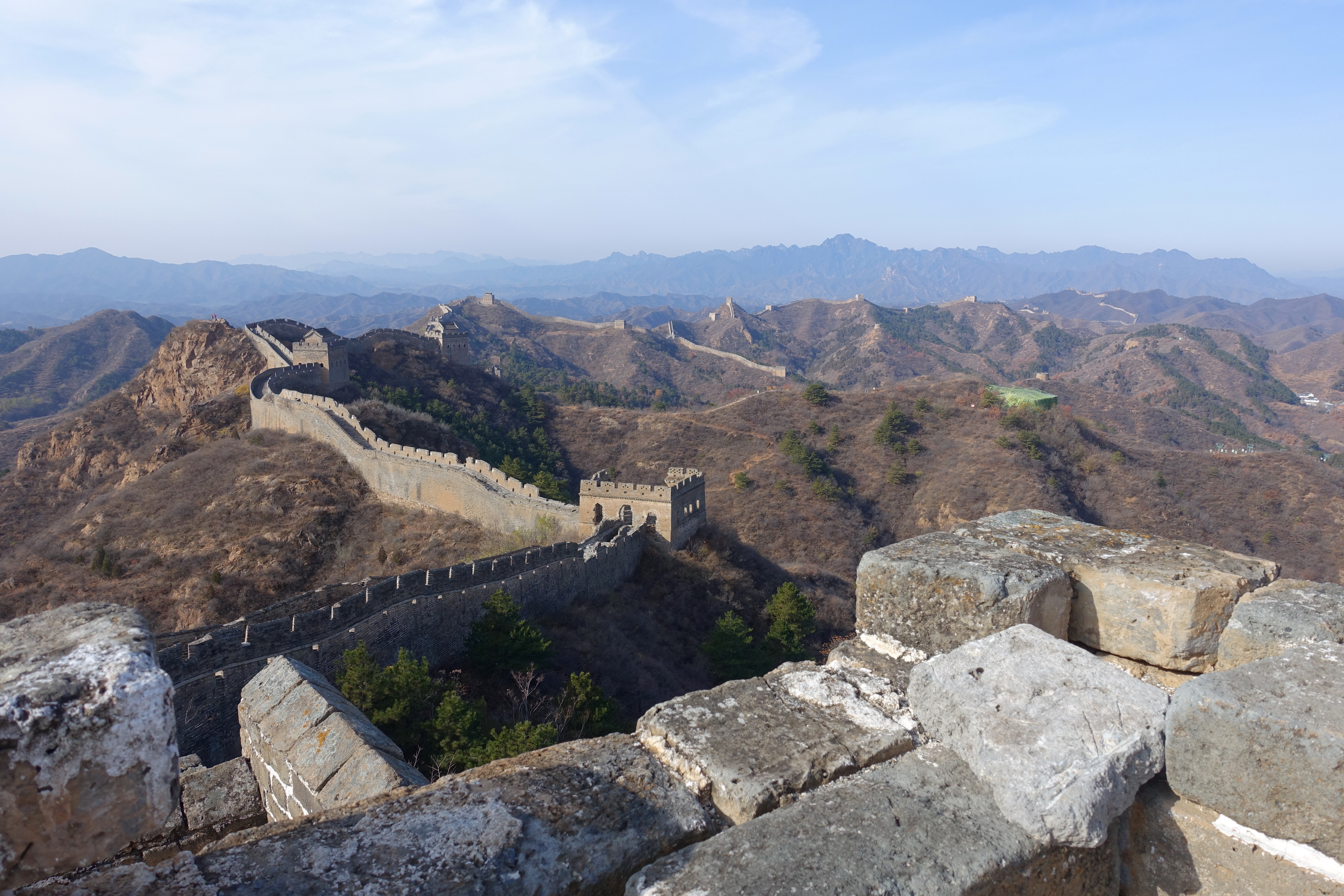
Jinshanling section (facing west)

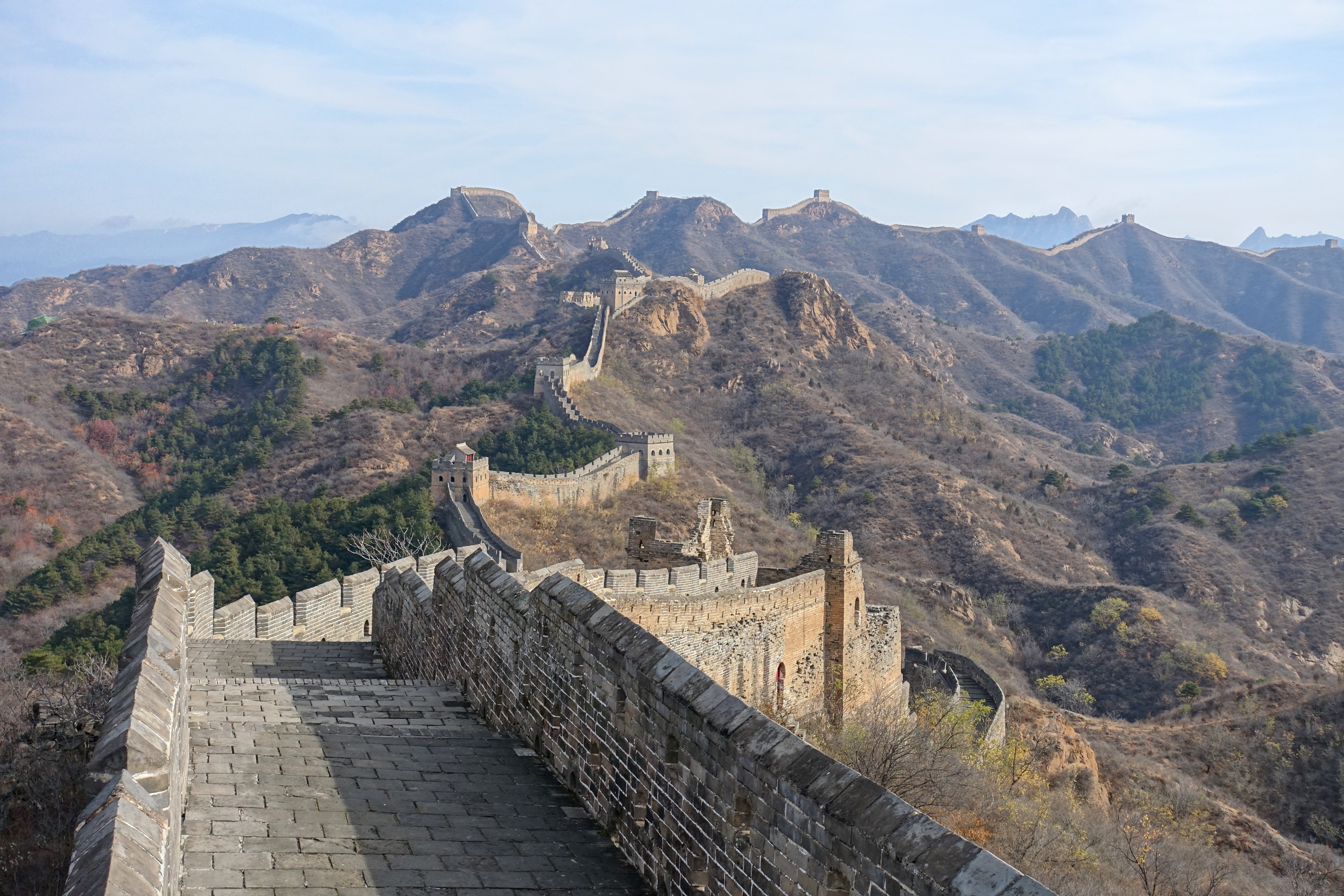
Jinshanling section (facing east)
