= Xinglong County =

Xinglong County 兴隆县
- County
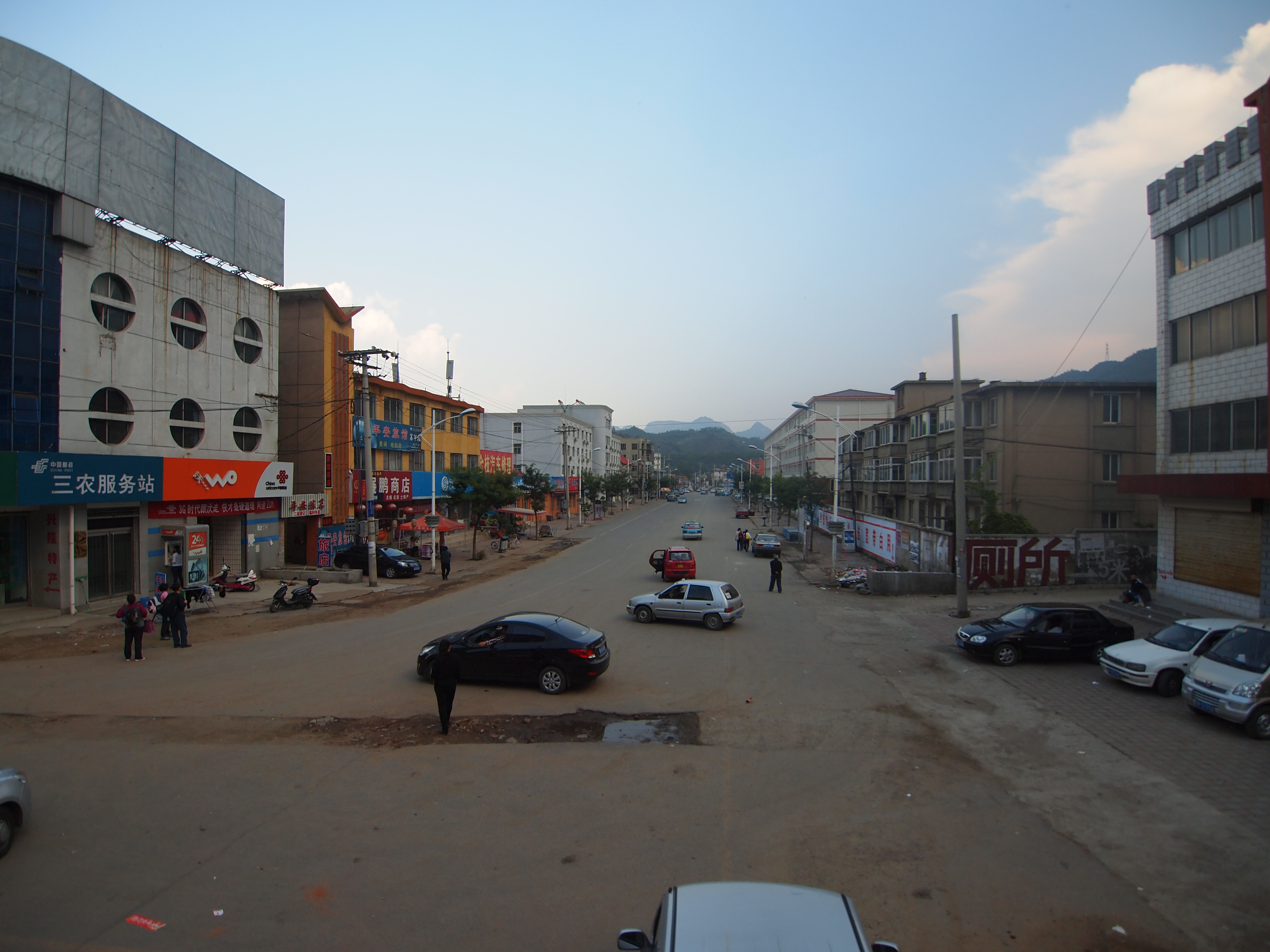

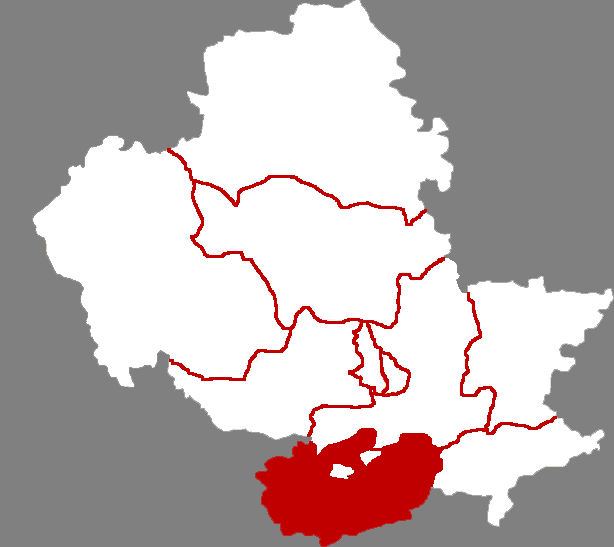
- Xinglong in Chengde

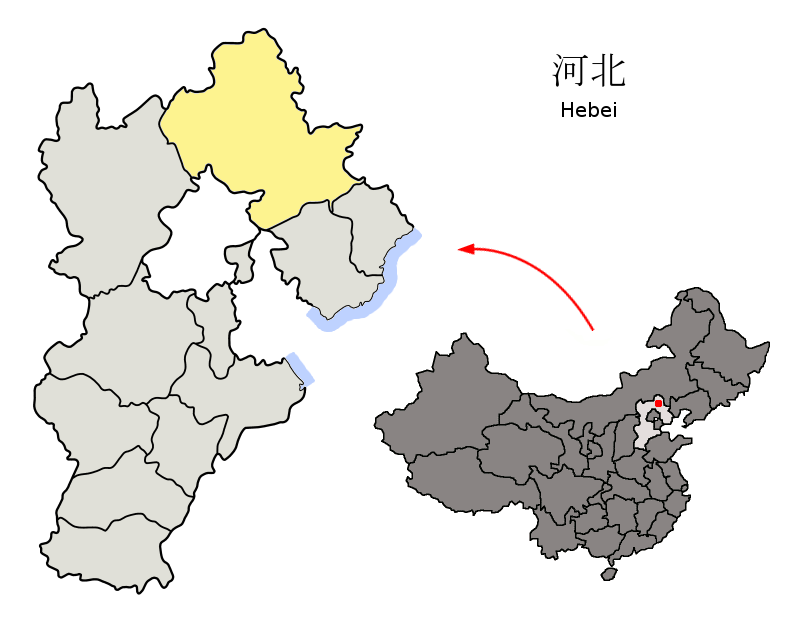
- Chengde in Hebei
- Coordinates: 40°25′03″N 117°30′02″E
- Country: People's Republic of China
- Province: Hebei
- Prefecture-level city: Chengde
- County seat: Xinglong Town (兴隆镇)

Area
  - Total: 3,116 km^{2} (1,203 sq mi)
- Elevation: 579 m (1,900 ft)

Population (2020 census)
  - Total: 271,628
  - Density: 87.17/km^{2} (225.8/sq mi)
- Time zone: UTC+8 (China Standard)
- Postal code: 067300
- Area code: 0314

Xinglong County (simplified Chinese: 兴隆县; traditional Chinese: 興隆縣; pinyin: Xīnglóng Xiàn) is a county in the northeast of Hebei province, bordering the municipalities of Beijing to the west and Tianjin to the southwest. It is under the administration of the prefecture-level city of Chengde, with a population of 270,000 residing in an area of 3,116 km^{2} (1,203 sq mi).

== Administrative divisions ==
There are 9 towns, 9 townships, and 2 ethnic townships under the county's administration.

Towns:

- Xinglong (兴隆镇)
- Liudaohe (六道河镇)
- Gualanyu (挂兰峪镇)
- Banbishan (半壁山镇)
- Ping'anbao (平安堡镇)
- Beiyingfang (北营房镇)
- Qingsongling (青松岭镇)
- Gushanzi (孤山子镇)
- Lanqiying (蓝旗营镇)

Townships:

- Xiataizi Township (下台子乡)
- Dazhangzi Township (大杖子乡)
- Beishuiquan Township (北水泉乡)
- Douziyu Township (陡子峪乡)
- Sandaohe Township (三道河乡)
- Dashuiquan Township (大水泉乡)
- Moguyu Township (蘑菇峪乡)
- Shangshidong Township (上石洞乡)
- Anziling Township (安子岭乡)
- Nantian Manchu Ethnic Township (南天门满族乡)
- Bagualing Manchu Ethnic Township (八卦岭满族乡)

== Climate ==
Climate data for Xinglong, elevation 633 m (2,077 ft), (1991–2020 normals, extremes 1981–2010)
Month	Jan	Feb	Mar	Apr	May	Jun	Jul	Aug	Sep	Oct	Nov	Dec	Year
Record high °C (°F)	12.1 (53.8)	17.1 (62.8)	24.9 (76.8)	29.6 (85.3)	35.1 (95.2)	35.6 (96.1)	36.7 (98.1)	34.2 (93.6)	32.9 (91.2)	28.7 (83.7)	21.1 (70.0)	16.6 (61.9)	36.7 (98.1)
Mean daily maximum °C (°F)	−1.3 (29.7)	2.3 (36.1)	8.9 (48.0)	16.9 (62.4)	23.1 (73.6)	26.6 (79.9)	27.9 (82.2)	27.1 (80.8)	22.7 (72.9)	15.9 (60.6)	6.9 (44.4)	0.1 (32.2)	14.8 (58.6)
Daily mean °C (°F)	−8.8 (16.2)	−5.0 (23.0)	2.1 (35.8)	10.3 (50.5)	16.5 (61.7)	20.4 (68.7)	22.5 (72.5)	21.1 (70.0)	15.5 (59.9)	8.4 (47.1)	0.0 (32.0)	−6.8 (19.8)	8.0 (46.4)
Mean daily minimum °C (°F)	−14.4 (6.1)	−10.9 (12.4)	−4.0 (24.8)	3.4 (38.1)	9.1 (48.4)	14.1 (57.4)	17.8 (64.0)	16.4 (61.5)	9.9 (49.8)	2.5 (36.5)	−5.1 (22.8)	−12 (10)	2.2 (36.0)
Record low °C (°F)	−29.4 (−20.9)	−24.6 (−12.3)	−21.5 (−6.7)	−8.7 (16.3)	−0.8 (30.6)	4.5 (40.1)	8.6 (47.5)	6.4 (43.5)	−1.6 (29.1)	−10.5 (13.1)	−26.1 (−15.0)	−26.1 (−15.0)	−29.4 (−20.9)
Average precipitation mm (inches)	2.5 (0.10)	4.7 (0.19)	11.4 (0.45)	27.9 (1.10)	53.8 (2.12)	99.0 (3.90)	240.4 (9.46)	148.5 (5.85)	65.5 (2.58)	34.3 (1.35)	15.2 (0.60)	3.1 (0.12)	706.3 (27.82)
Average precipitation days (≥ 0.1 mm)	1.7	2.4	3.7	5.2	7.9	11.7	14.5	11.8	8.2	5.3	3.4	2.5	78.3
Average snowy days	3.3	3.7	3.5	0.8	0.1	0	0	0	0	0.4	3.2	3.7	18.7
Average relative humidity (%)	52	49	46	47	54	68	80	81	77	67	59	55	61
Mean monthly sunshine hours	191.2	196.0	232.8	241.8	268.9	227.0	193.4	210.7	212.7	211.2	183.5	178.9	2,548.1
Percentage possible sunshine	64	64	62	60	60	51	43	50	58	62	62	62	58
Source: China Meteorological Administration

== Transportation ==
- Beijing–Chengde Railway
- China National Highway 112
