= Shuangqiao, Chengde =

Shuangqiao 双桥区
- District
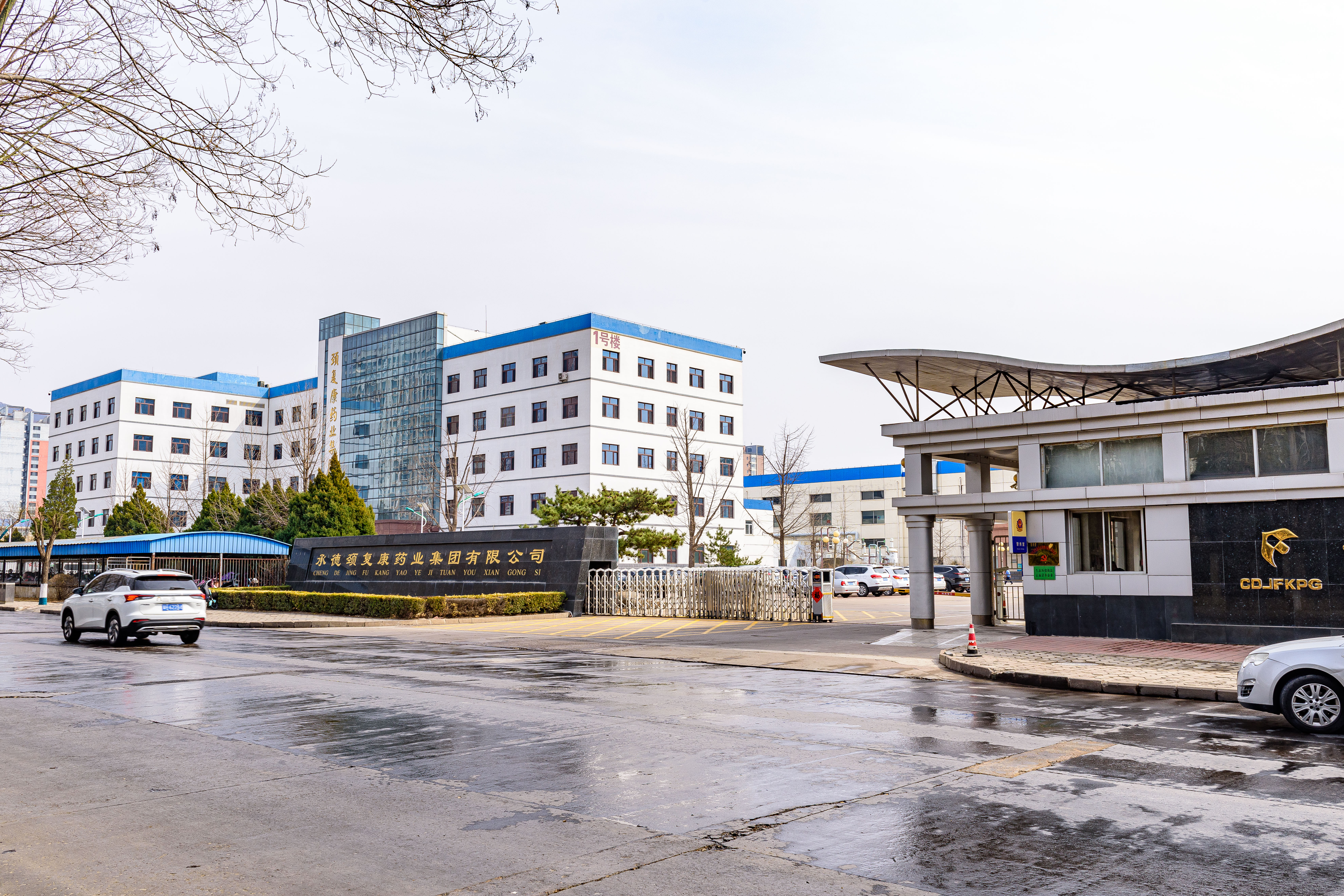
- Jingfukang Pharmaceutical Group headquarters within the district

- Location in Hebei
- Coordinates: 40°58′00″N 117°54′30″E
- Country: China
- Province: Hebei
- Prefecture-level city: Chengde
- District seat: Zhonghua Road Subdistrict

Area
  - Total: 651.67 km^{2} (251.61 sq mi)

Population (2020 census)
  - Total: 358,431
  - Density: 550.02/km^{2} (1,424.5/sq mi)
- Time zone: UTC+8 (China Standard)
- Website: www.sqq.gov.cn

Shuangqiao District (simplified Chinese: 双桥区; traditional Chinese: 雙橋區; pinyin: Shuāngqiáo Qū; lit. 'double bridge') is a district of Chengde, Hebei, China.

Chengde Mountain Resort is located at this district.

== Administrative divisions ==
Shuangqiao District is divided into 7 subdistricts and 5 towns.

7 subdistricts are: Xidajie Subdistrict (西大街街道), Toudaopailou Subdistrict (头道牌楼街道), Panjiagou Subdistrict (潘家沟街道), Zhonghua Road Subdistrict (中华路街道), Xinhua Road Subdistrict (新华路街道), Shidongzigou Subdistrict (石洞子沟街道), Qiaodong Subdistrict (桥东街道).

5 towns are: Shuiquangou (水泉沟镇), Shizigou (狮子沟镇), Niuquanzigou (牛圈子沟镇), Dashimiao (大石庙镇), Shuangfengsi (双峰寺镇).
