= Kuancheng Manchu Autonomous County =

Kuancheng County 宽城县 ᡴᡠᠸᠠᠨ ᠴᡝᠩ ᠰᡳᠶᠠᠨ Kwancheng
- Autonomous county
- 宽城满族自治县 ᡴᡠᠸᠠᠨ ᠴᡝᠩ ᠮᠠᠨᠵᡠ ᠪᡝᠶᡝ ᡩᠠᠰᠠᡵᠠ ᡥᡳᠶᠠᠨ; Kuancheng Manchu Autonomous County
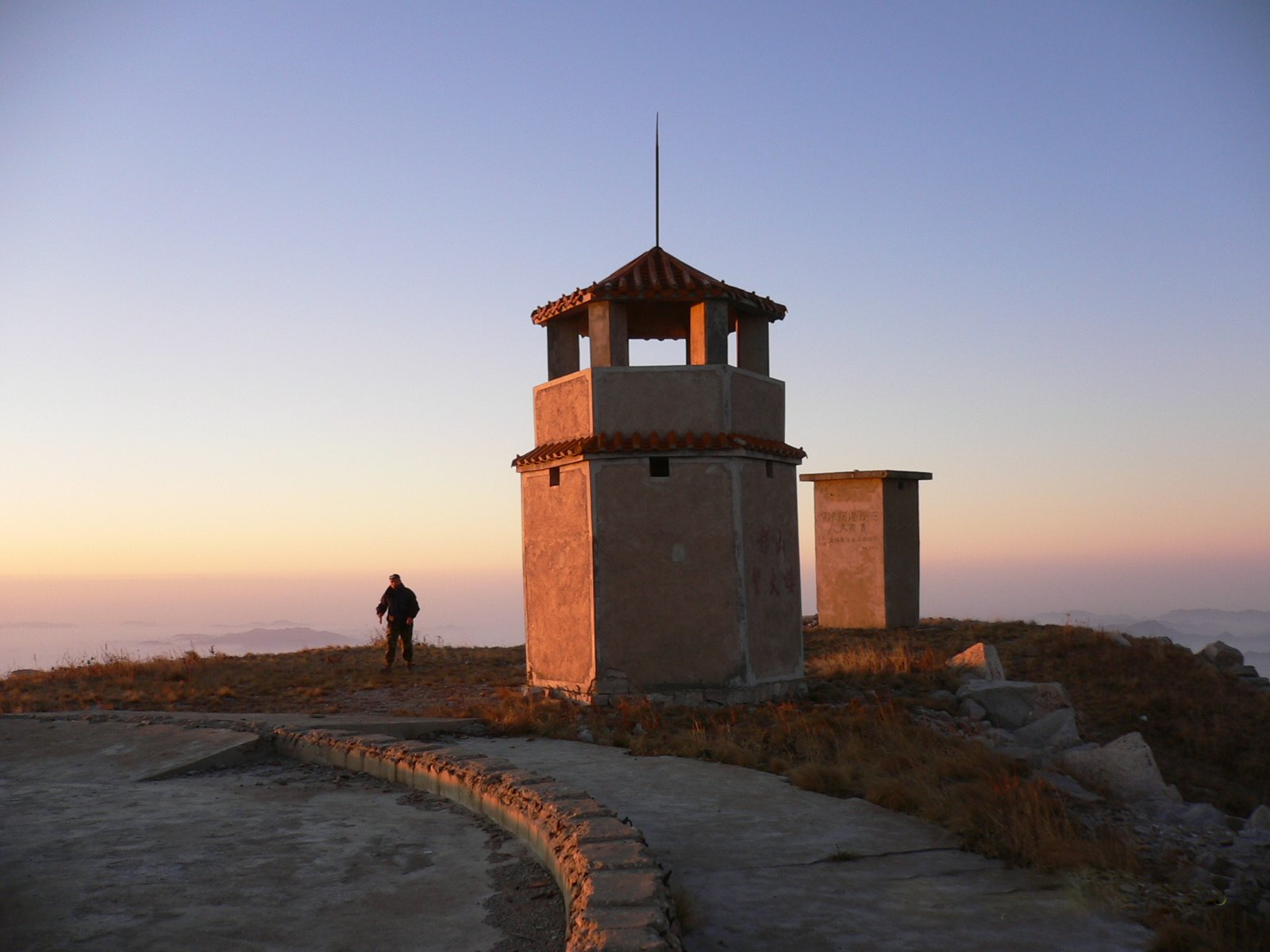

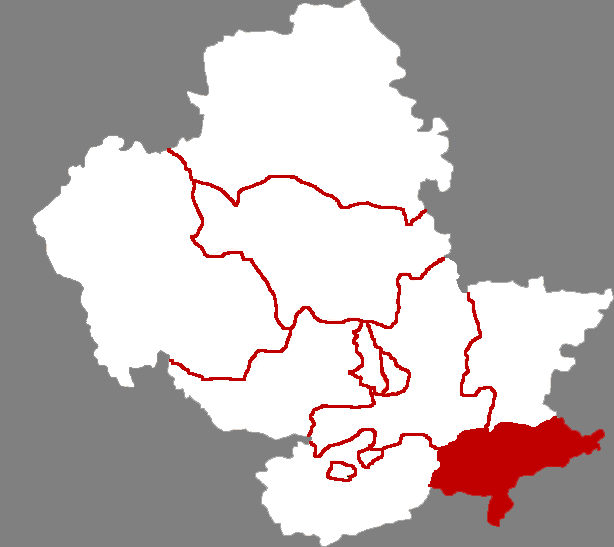
- Kuancheng in Chengde

- Location of the seat in Hebei
- Coordinates: 40°36′40″N 118°29′06″E
- Country: China
- Province: Hebei
- Prefecture-level city: Chengde
- County seat: Kuancheng Town

Area
  - Total: 1,933 km^{2} (746 sq mi)
- Elevation: 303 m (994 ft)

Population (2020 census)
  - Total: 240,579
  - Density: 124.5/km^{2} (322.3/sq mi)
- Time zone: UTC+8 (China Standard)
- Postal code: 067600
- Area code: 0314
- Website: www.hbkc.gov.cn

Kuancheng Manchu Autonomous County

Chinese name
- Simplified Chinese: 宽城满族自治县
- Traditional Chinese: 寬城滿族自治縣
Transcriptions
Standard Mandarin
- Hanyu Pinyin: Kuānchéng Mǎnzú Zìzhìxiàn

Manchu name
- Manchu script: ᡴᡠᠸᠠᠨ ᠴᡝᠩ ᠮᠠᠨᠵᡠ ᠪᡝᠶᡝ ᡩᠠᠰᠠᡵᠠ ᡥᡳᠶᠠᠨ
- Möllendorff: kuwan ceng manju beye dasara hiyan

Kuancheng Manchu Autonomous County (Chinese: 宽城满族自治县; Manchu: ᡴᡠᠸᠠᠨ ᠴᡝᠩ ᠮᠠᠨᠵᡠ ᠪᡝᠶᡝ ᡩᠠᠰᠠᡵᠠ ᡥᡳᠶᠠᠨ) is a Manchu autonomous county of northeastern Hebei province, China, on the banks of the Luan River, bordering Liaoning to the east. It is under the administration of Chengde City, and as of 2020, it had a population of 240,000 residing in an area of 1,933 km^{2} (746 sq mi).

== Administrative divisions ==
There are 10 towns and 8 townships under the county's administration.

Name	Simplified Chinese	Hanyu Pinyin	Manchu	Möllendorff
Towns
Kuancheng Town	宽城镇	Kuānchéng Zhèn	ᡴᡠᠸᠠᠨ ᠴᡝᠩ ᡴᠠᡩᠠᠯᠠᠩᡤᠠ	kuwan ceng kadalangga
Longxumen Town	龙须门镇	Lóngxūmén Zhèn	ᠯᡡᠩ ᡧᡠ ᠮᡝᠨ ᡴᠠᡩᠠᠯᠠᠩᡤᠠ	lūng šu men kadalangga
Yu'erya Town	峪耳崖镇	Yù'ěryá Zhèn	ᠶᡠ ᠋ᡝᡵ ᠶᠠ ᡴᠠᡩᠠᠯᠠᠩᡤᠠ	yu 'er ya kadalangga
Bancheng Town	板城镇	Bǎnchéng Zhèn	ᠪᠠᠨ ᠴᡝᠩ ᡴᠠᡩᠠᠯᠠᠩᡤᠠ	ban ceng kadalangga
Tangdaohe Town	汤道河镇	Tāngdàohé Zhèn	ᡨᠠᠩ ᡩᠠᡡ ᡥᡝ ᡴᠠᡩᠠᠯᠠᠩᡤᠠ	tang daū he ceng kadalangga
Boluotai Town	饽罗台镇	Bōluótái Zhèn	ᠪᠣᠯᡠᠣ ᡨᠠᡳ ᡴᠠᡩᠠᠯᠠᠩᡤᠠ	boluo tai kadalangga
Nianziyu Town	碾子峪镇	Niǎnzǐyù Zhèn	ᠨᡳᠠᠨᡯᡳ ᠶᡠ ᡴᠠᡩᠠᠯᠠᠩᡤᠠ	niandzi yu kadalangga
Liangjiatai Town	亮甲台镇	Liàngjiǎtái Zhèn	ᠯᡳᠠᠩ ᠵᡳᠠ ᡨᠠᡳ ᡴᠠᡩᠠᠯᠠᠩᡤᠠ	liang jia tai kadalangga
Huapiliuzi Town	化皮溜子镇	Huàpíliūzǐ Zhèn	ᡥᡠᠠ ᡦᡳ ᠯᡳᠣᡡᡯᡳ ᡴᠠᡩᠠᠯᠠᠩᡤᠠ	hua pi lioūdzi kadalangga
Songling Town	松岭镇	Sōnglǐng Zhèn	ᠰᡡᠩ ᠯᡳᠩ ᡴᠠᡩᠠᠯᠠᠩᡤᠠ	sūng ling kadalangga
Townships
Tashan Township	塌山乡	Tāshān Xiāng	ᡨᠠ ᡧᠠᠨ ᡤᠠᡧᠠᠨ	ta šan gašan
Mengziling Township	孟子岭乡	Mèngzǐlǐng Xiāng	ᠮᡝᠩᡯᡳ ᠯᡳᠩ ᡤᠠᡧᠠᠨ	mengdzi ling gašan
Dushigou Township	独石沟乡	Dúshígōu Xiāng	ᡩᡠ ᡧᡳ ᡤᠣᡡ ᡤᠠᡧᠠᠨ	du ši goū gašan
Huajian Township	铧尖乡	Huájiān Xiāng	ᡥᡠᠠ ᠵᡳᠠᠨ ᡤᠠᡧᠠᠨ	hua jian gašan
Donghuanghuachuan Township	东黄花川乡	Dōnghuánghuāchuān Xiāng	ᡩᡡᠩ ᡥᡠᠠᠩ ᡥᡠᠠ ᠴᡠᠠᠨ ᡤᠠᡧᠠᠨ	dūng huang hua cuan gašan
Weizigou Township	苇子沟乡	Wěizǐgōu Xiāng	ᠸᡝᡳᡯᡳ ᡤᠣᡡ ᡤᠠᡧᠠᠨ	weidzi goū gašan
Dazigoumen Township	大字沟门乡	Dàzìgōumén Xiāng	ᡩᠠᡯᡳ ᡤᠣᡡ ᠮᡝᠨ ᡤᠠᡧᠠᠨ	dadzi goū men gašan
Dashizhuzi Township	大石柱子乡	Dàshízhùzǐ Xiāng	ᡩᠠᡧᡳᡯᡥᡠᡯᡳ ᡤᠠᡧᠠᠨ	dašidzhudzi gašan

== Climate ==
Climate data for Kuancheng, elevation 369 m (1,211 ft), (1991–2020 normals, extremes 1981–2010)
Month	Jan	Feb	Mar	Apr	May	Jun	Jul	Aug	Sep	Oct	Nov	Dec	Year
Record high °C (°F)	12.2 (54.0)	18.8 (65.8)	26.4 (79.5)	31.1 (88.0)	37.0 (98.6)	38.1 (100.6)	40.3 (104.5)	37.0 (98.6)	35.1 (95.2)	30.3 (86.5)	21.8 (71.2)	13.3 (55.9)	40.3 (104.5)
Mean daily maximum °C (°F)	−0.2 (31.6)	3.8 (38.8)	10.7 (51.3)	18.8 (65.8)	25.2 (77.4)	28.7 (83.7)	30.1 (86.2)	29.3 (84.7)	24.9 (76.8)	17.6 (63.7)	8.1 (46.6)	1.1 (34.0)	16.5 (61.7)
Daily mean °C (°F)	−7.3 (18.9)	−3.4 (25.9)	3.8 (38.8)	12.1 (53.8)	18.5 (65.3)	22.4 (72.3)	24.6 (76.3)	23.3 (73.9)	17.7 (63.9)	10.1 (50.2)	1.3 (34.3)	−5.5 (22.1)	9.8 (49.6)
Mean daily minimum °C (°F)	−12.6 (9.3)	−9.2 (15.4)	−2.4 (27.7)	5.3 (41.5)	11.5 (52.7)	16.5 (61.7)	20.0 (68.0)	18.7 (65.7)	12.1 (53.8)	4.3 (39.7)	−3.7 (25.3)	−10.3 (13.5)	4.2 (39.5)
Record low °C (°F)	−25.5 (−13.9)	−22.3 (−8.1)	−16.0 (3.2)	−6.3 (20.7)	2.1 (35.8)	6.3 (43.3)	11.4 (52.5)	9.0 (48.2)	0.5 (32.9)	−8.0 (17.6)	−19.1 (−2.4)	−22.5 (−8.5)	−25.5 (−13.9)
Average precipitation mm (inches)	2.1 (0.08)	2.8 (0.11)	7.3 (0.29)	26.0 (1.02)	51.6 (2.03)	99.1 (3.90)	195.7 (7.70)	136.9 (5.39)	54.0 (2.13)	28.9 (1.14)	10.9 (0.43)	2.1 (0.08)	617.4 (24.3)
Average precipitation days (≥ 0.1 mm)	1.5	1.8	2.7	5.0	8.3	12.2	14.0	11.5	8.0	4.8	3.4	1.8	75
Average snowy days	2.2	2.4	2.5	0.7	0	0	0	0	0	0.3	3.0	2.7	13.8
Average relative humidity (%)	50	46	42	43	50	64	75	76	70	62	57	52	57
Mean monthly sunshine hours	180.8	185.5	221.4	225.6	251.7	214.4	185.7	199.7	204.9	200.3	166.2	167.9	2,404.1
Percentage possible sunshine	60	61	59	56	56	48	41	47	55	59	56	59	55
Source: China Meteorological Administration
