= Chengde County =

Chengde County 承德县
- County
- Location in Hebei
- Coordinates: 40°46′N 118°10′E
- Country: People's Republic of China
- Province: Hebei
- Prefecture-level city: Chengde

Area
  - Total: 3,695 km^{2} (1,427 sq mi)

Population (2020 census)
  - Total: 340,579
  - Density: 92.17/km^{2} (238.7/sq mi)
- Time zone: UTC+8 (China Standard)
- Postal code: 067400

Chengde County (simplified Chinese: 承德县; traditional Chinese: 承德縣; pinyin: Chéngdé Xiàn) is a county in the northeast of Hebei province, People's Republic of China. It is under the administration of the Chengde City.

== Administrative Divisions ==
Towns:

- Xiabancheng (下板城镇), Shangbancheng (上板城镇), Jiashan (甲山镇), Liugou (六沟镇), Sangou (三沟镇), Tougou (头沟镇), Gaositai (高寺台镇), Shuangfengsi (双峰寺镇)

Townships:

- Dongxiaobaiqi Township (东小白旗乡), Anjiang Township (鞍匠乡), Liuzhangzi Township (刘杖子乡), Xinzhangzi Township (新杖子乡), Mengjiayuan Township (孟家院乡), Dayingzi Township (大营子乡), Bajia Township (八家乡), Shanggu Township (上谷乡), Manzhangzi Township (满杖子乡), Shihuiyao Township (石灰窑乡), Wudaohe Township (五道河乡), Chagou Township (岔沟乡), Dengshan Township (磴上乡), Sanjia Township (三家乡), Cangzi Township (仓子乡), Gangzi Manchu Ethnic Township (岗子满族乡), Liangjia Manchu Ethnic Township (两家满族乡)

== Climate ==
Climate data for Chengde County, elevation 330 m (1,080 ft), (1991–2020 normals, extremes 1981–2010)
Month	Jan	Feb	Mar	Apr	May	Jun	Jul	Aug	Sep	Oct	Nov	Dec	Year
Record high °C (°F)	11.0 (51.8)	19.1 (66.4)	29.2 (84.6)	32.4 (90.3)	38.6 (101.5)	38.9 (102.0)	41.3 (106.3)	39.0 (102.2)	37.8 (100.0)	31.5 (88.7)	21.0 (69.8)	11.0 (51.8)	41.3 (106.3)
Mean daily maximum °C (°F)	−0.7 (30.7)	4.3 (39.7)	11.7 (53.1)	19.9 (67.8)	26.2 (79.2)	29.7 (85.5)	31.1 (88.0)	30.2 (86.4)	25.6 (78.1)	18.2 (64.8)	8.0 (46.4)	0.3 (32.5)	17.0 (62.7)
Daily mean °C (°F)	−8.4 (16.9)	−3.7 (25.3)	4.0 (39.2)	12.5 (54.5)	18.7 (65.7)	22.7 (72.9)	25.0 (77.0)	23.5 (74.3)	17.7 (63.9)	10.0 (50.0)	0.7 (33.3)	−6.7 (19.9)	9.7 (49.4)
Mean daily minimum °C (°F)	−14.1 (6.6)	−10.0 (14.0)	−2.8 (27.0)	5.1 (41.2)	11.2 (52.2)	16.5 (61.7)	19.9 (67.8)	18.5 (65.3)	11.8 (53.2)	3.9 (39.0)	−4.5 (23.9)	−11.8 (10.8)	3.6 (38.6)
Record low °C (°F)	−27.9 (−18.2)	−23.5 (−10.3)	−20.3 (−4.5)	−6.5 (20.3)	0.8 (33.4)	7.2 (45.0)	11.8 (53.2)	9.5 (49.1)	1.0 (33.8)	−7.9 (17.8)	−20.6 (−5.1)	−23.5 (−10.3)	−27.9 (−18.2)
Average precipitation mm (inches)	1.6 (0.06)	3.1 (0.12)	7.6 (0.30)	25.1 (0.99)	49.9 (1.96)	95.0 (3.74)	145.9 (5.74)	104.6 (4.12)	49.5 (1.95)	28.3 (1.11)	10.3 (0.41)	1.9 (0.07)	522.8 (20.57)
Average precipitation days (≥ 0.1 mm)	1.3	1.9	3.1	5.4	8.1	11.8	12.8	10.3	7.6	4.9	3.3	1.7	72.2
Average snowy days	2.4	2.5	2.6	0.7	0	0	0	0	0	0.3	2.6	2.9	14
Average relative humidity (%)	53	47	42	41	50	63	73	75	71	63	58	55	58
Mean monthly sunshine hours	182.1	191.6	229.1	239.8	265.3	224.4	206.5	217.0	211.2	206.6	171.1	167.5	2,512.2
Percentage possible sunshine	61	63	61	60	59	50	45	51	57	61	58	59	57
Source: China Meteorological Administration

== Transportation ==
The Jinzhou–Chengde railway passes through the county and has several stops. The Beijing–Shenyang high-speed railway also has a single stop in the county, Chengdexian North railway station.
