= Chengde =

Prefecture-level city in Hebei, China

Chengde 承德市 Chengte, Jehol
- Prefecture-level city
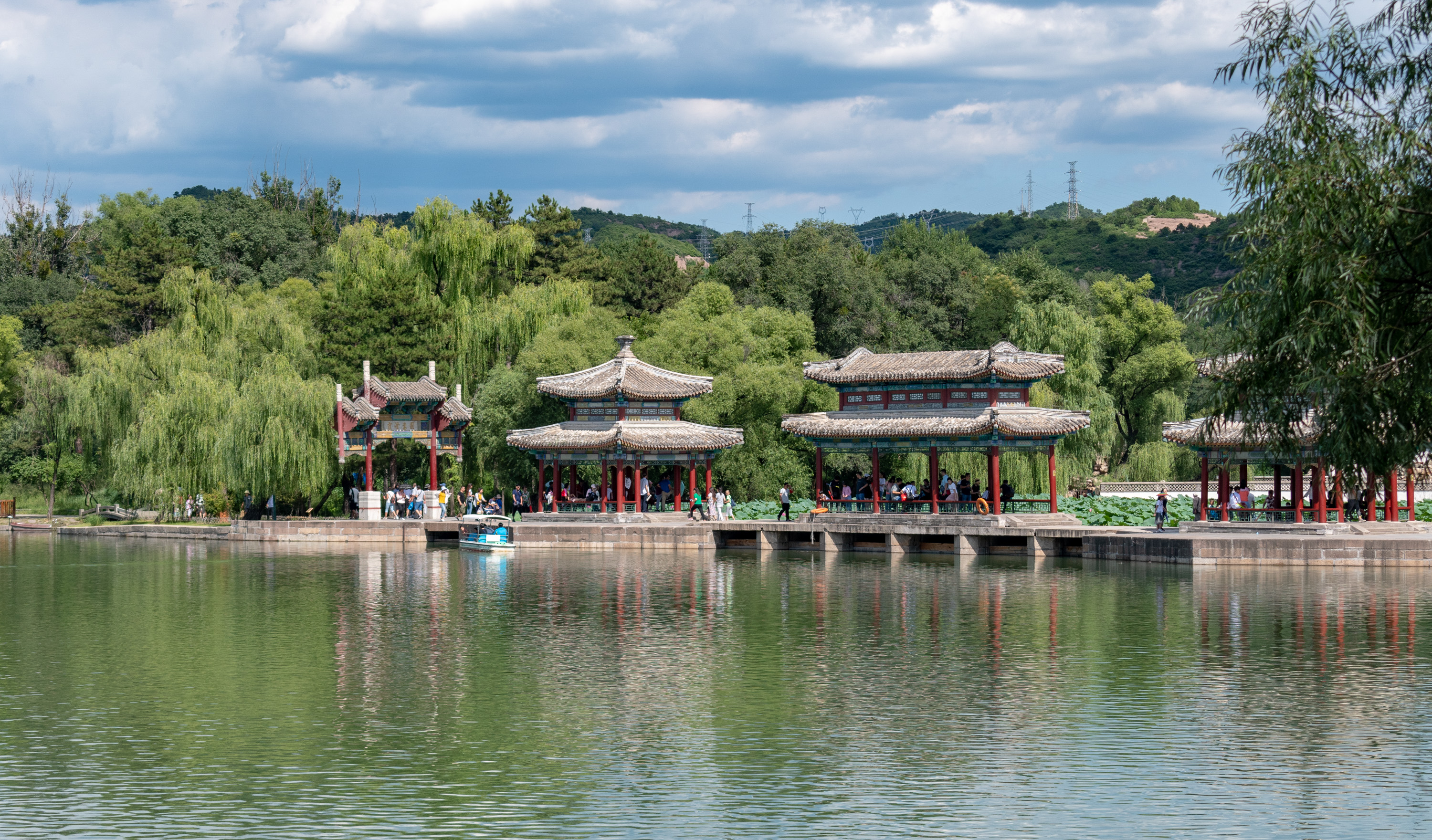
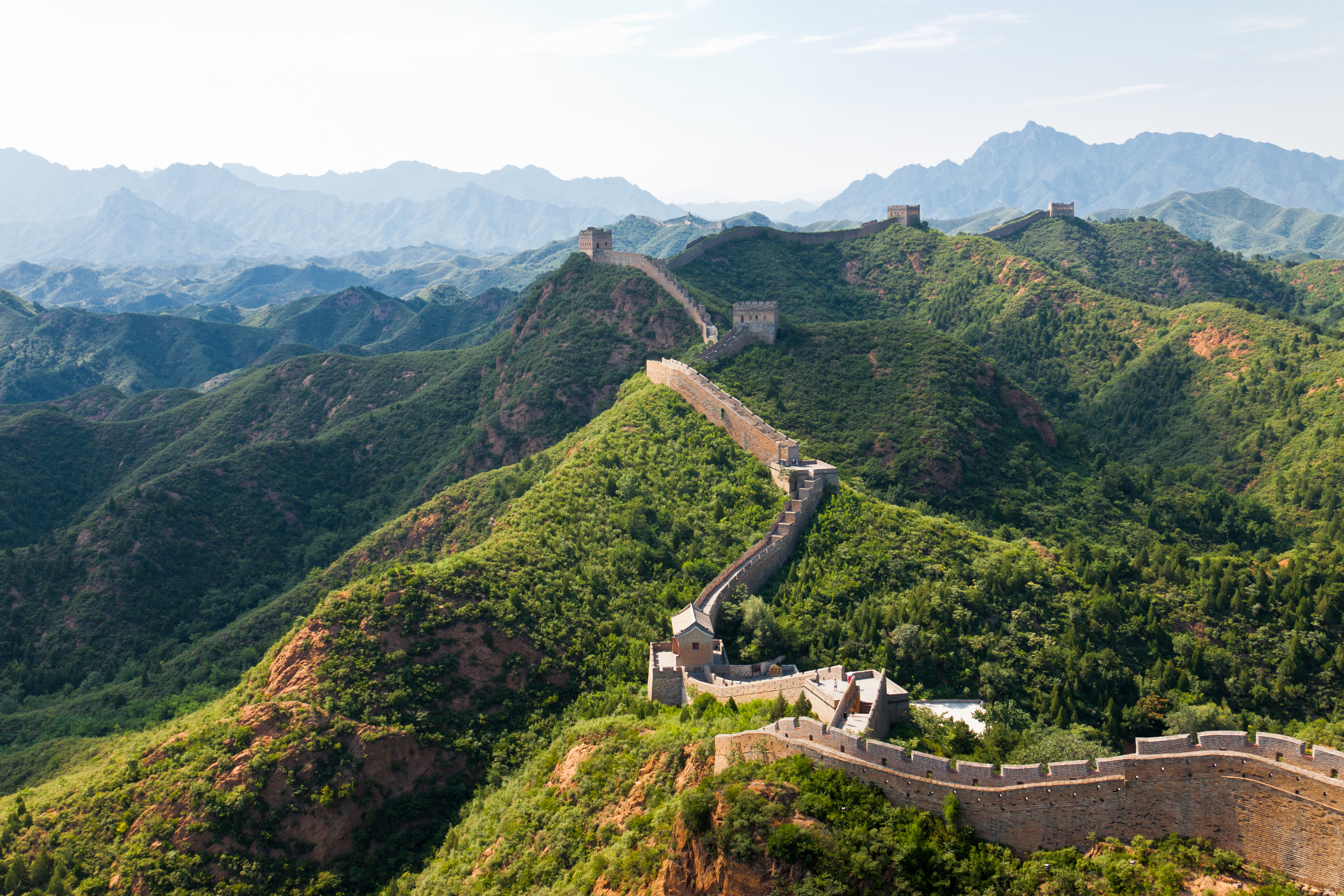
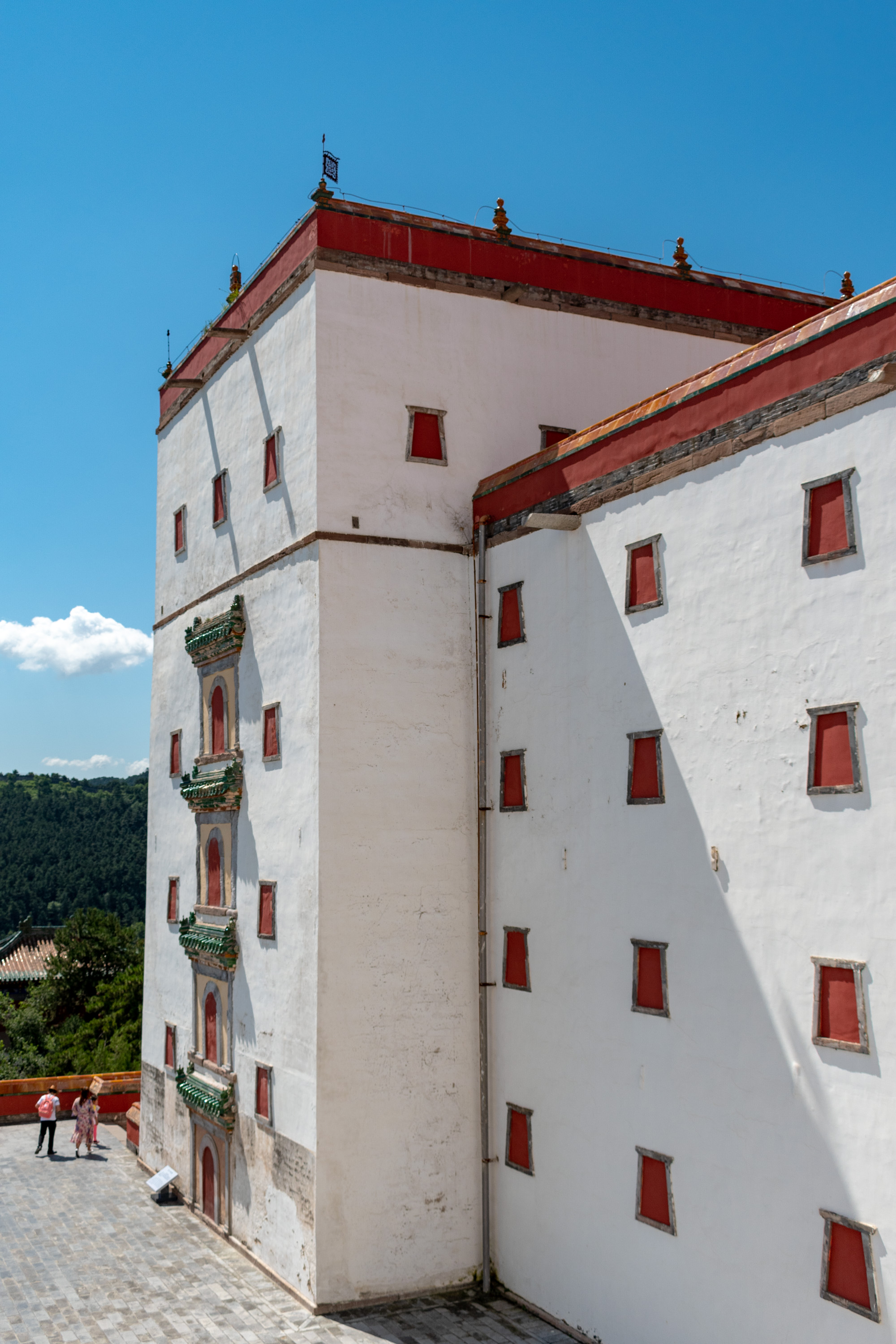
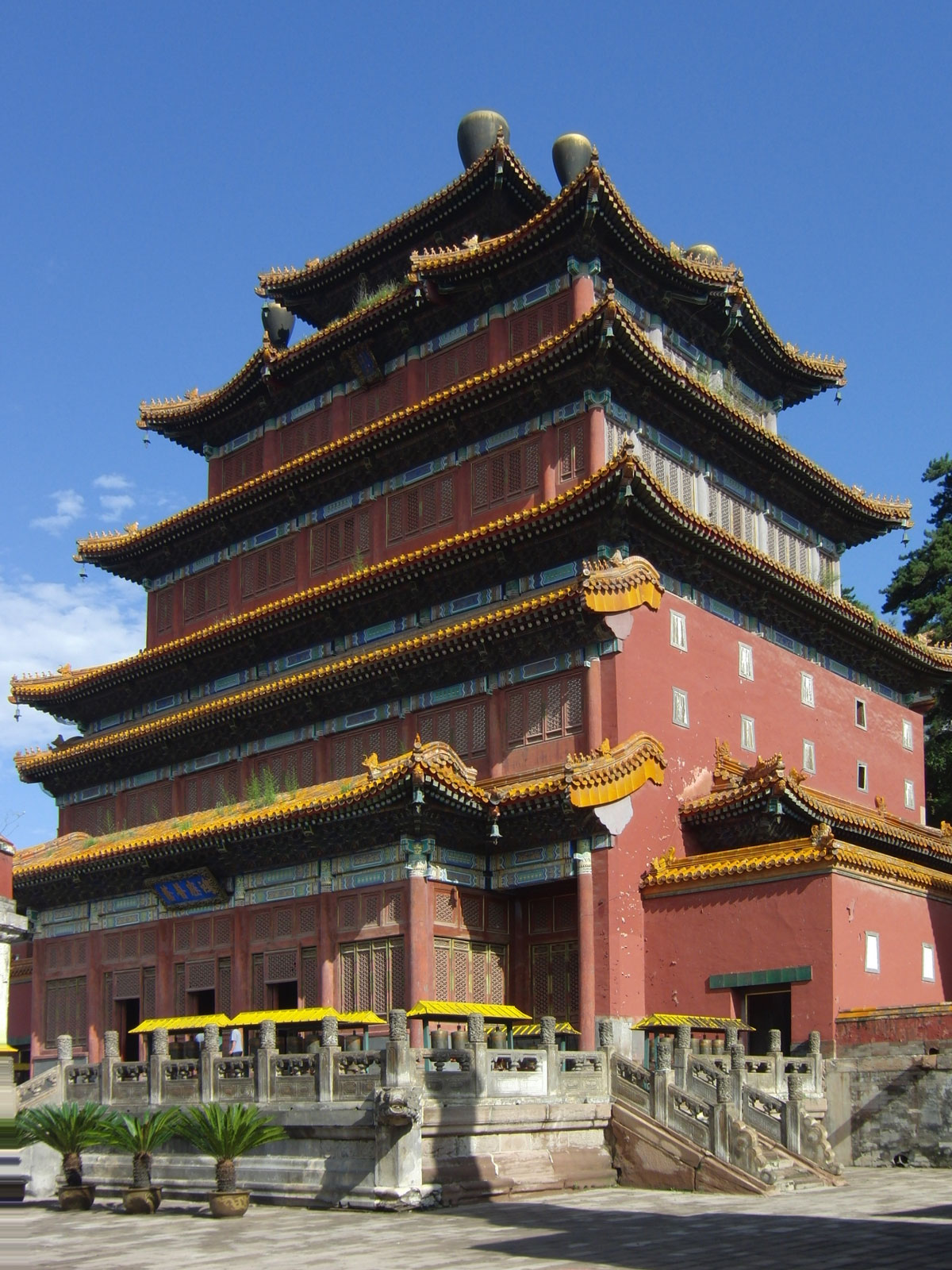
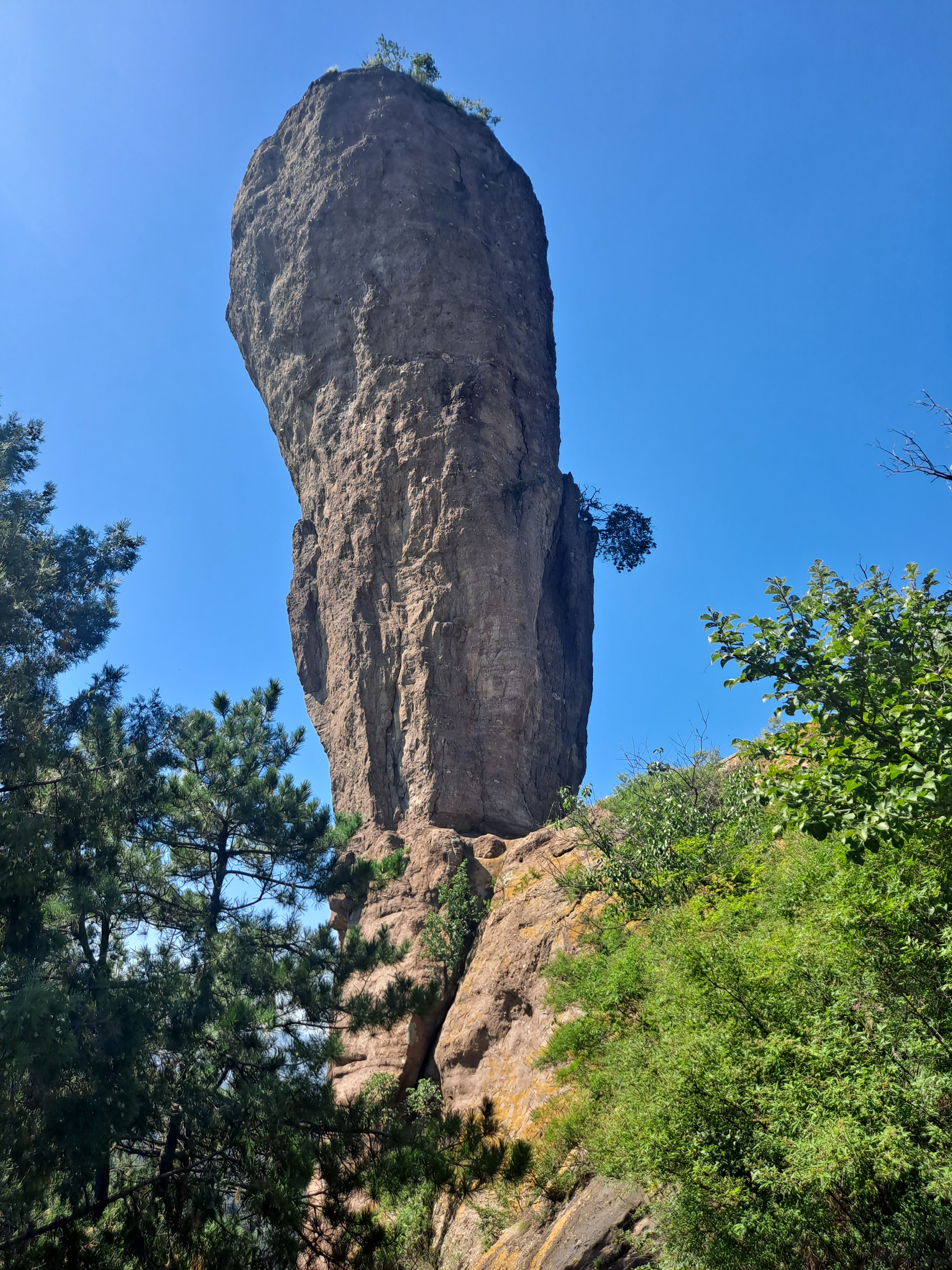
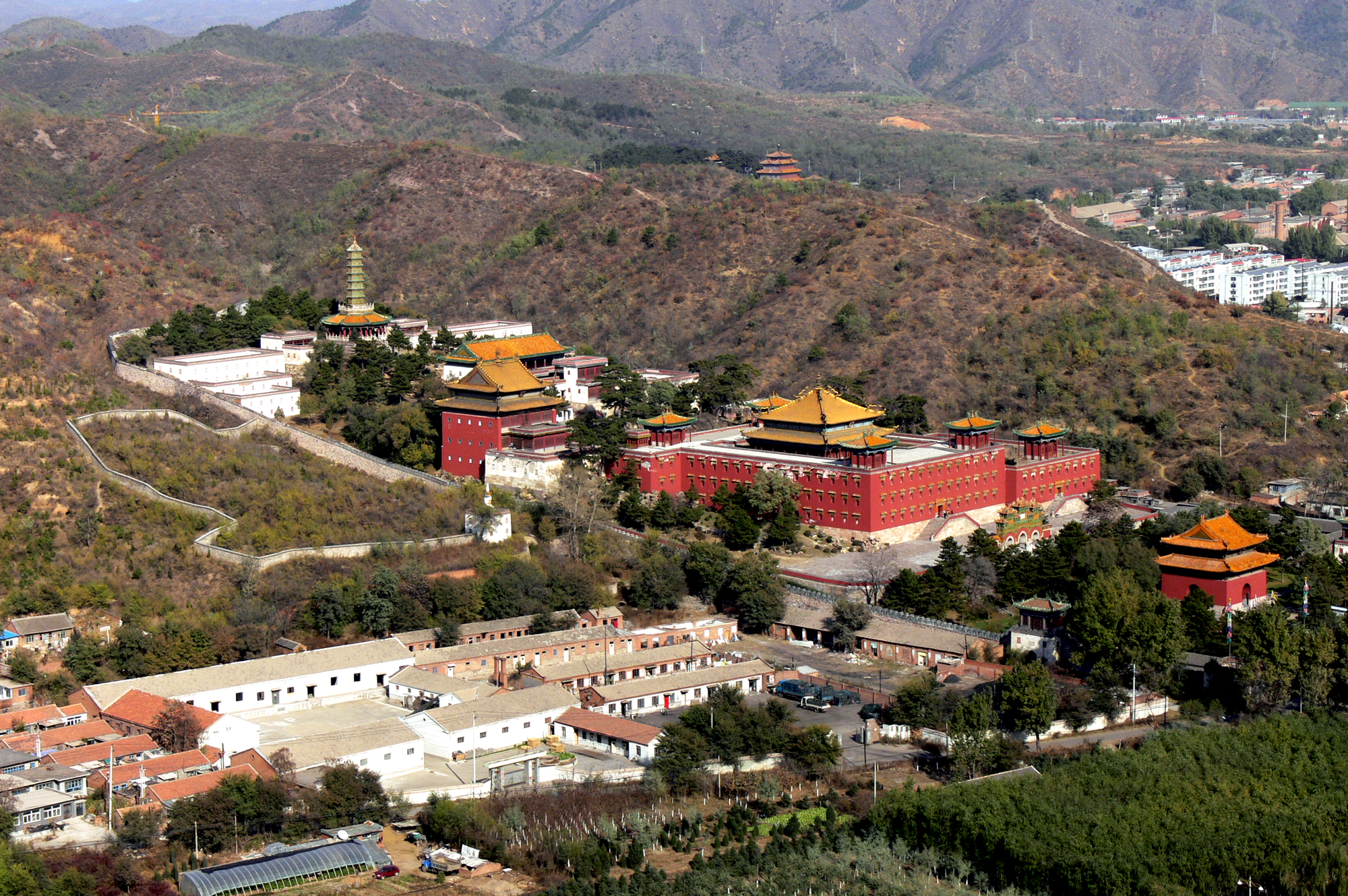
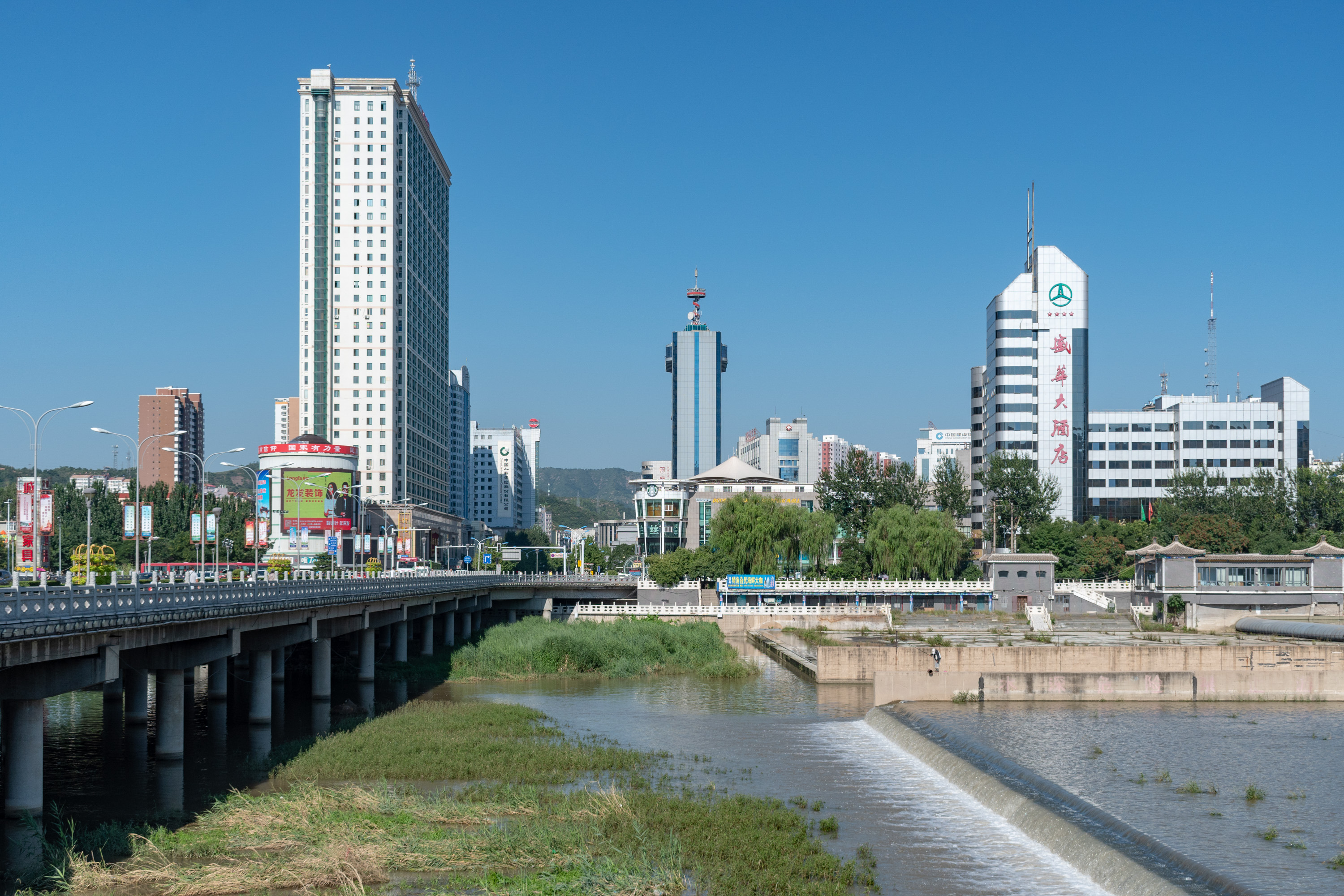
- Chengde Mountain Resort The Great Wall at Jinshanling Putuo Zongcheng Temple Puning Temple Sledgehammer Peak Xumi Fushou Temple Skyline of downtown Chengde
- Interactive map of Chengde
- Location of the city centre in Hebei Chengde (Northern China) Chengde (China)
- Coordinates (Chengde municipal government): 40°57′11″N 117°57′47″E
- Country: People's Republic of China
- Province: Hebei
- Settled: 1681
- Established: November 15, 1983
- Municipal seat: Shuangqiao District

Area
  - Prefecture-level city: 39,519 km^{2} (15,258 sq mi)
  - Urban: 724.03 km^{2} (279.55 sq mi)
  - Districts: 1,252.7 km^{2} (483.7 sq mi)
- Elevation: 327 m (1,073 ft)

Population (2020)
  - Prefecture-level city: 3,473,200
  - Density: 91/km^{2} (240/sq mi)
  - Urban: 920,395
  - Urban density: 1,271.2/km^{2} (3,292.4/sq mi)
  - Districts: 642,000

GDP
  - Prefecture-level city: CN¥ 135.9 billion US$ 21.8 billion
  - Per capita: CN¥ 38,506; US$6,182
- Area code: 314
- ISO 3166 code: CN-HE-08
- License Plate Prefix: 冀H
- Website: http://www.chengde.gov.cn
- City tree Pagoda Tree City flower Rugosa Rose

Chengde

Chinese name
- Chinese: 承德
- Postal: Chengte
- Literal meaning: Upholding Benevolence; Receiving Benevolence
Transcriptions
Standard Mandarin
- Hanyu Pinyin: Chéngdé
- Wade–Giles: Ch‘êng-tê

Rehe
- Traditional Chinese: 熱河(兒)
- Simplified Chinese: 热河(儿)
- Postal: Jehol
- Literal meaning: Hot River
Transcriptions
Standard Mandarin
- Hanyu Pinyin: Rèhé('ér)
- Wade–Giles: Jê-ho(-êrh)

Mongolian name
- Mongolian Cyrillic: Халуун гол
- Mongolian script: ᠬᠠᠯᠠᠭᠤᠨ ᠭᠣᠣᠯ
Transcriptions
- SASM/GNC: Khaluun Gol

Manchu name
- Manchu script: ᡝᡵᡩᡝᠮᡠ ᠪᡝ ᠠᠯᡳᡥᠠ
- Abkai: Erdemu Be Aliha

Chengde, formerly known as Jehol and Rehe, is a prefecture-level city in Hebei province, situated about 225 kilometres (140 mi) northeast of Beijing. It is best known as the site of the Mountain Resort, a vast imperial garden and palace formerly used by the Qing emperors as summer residence. Its local dialect is also known for being the closest to Standard Chinese. The permanent resident population is approximately 3,473,200 in 2017. At the end of 2024, the total resident population of the city was 3,285,700, a decrease of 16,500 from the end of the previous year. The urbanization rate of the resident population is 59.77%.

== History ==
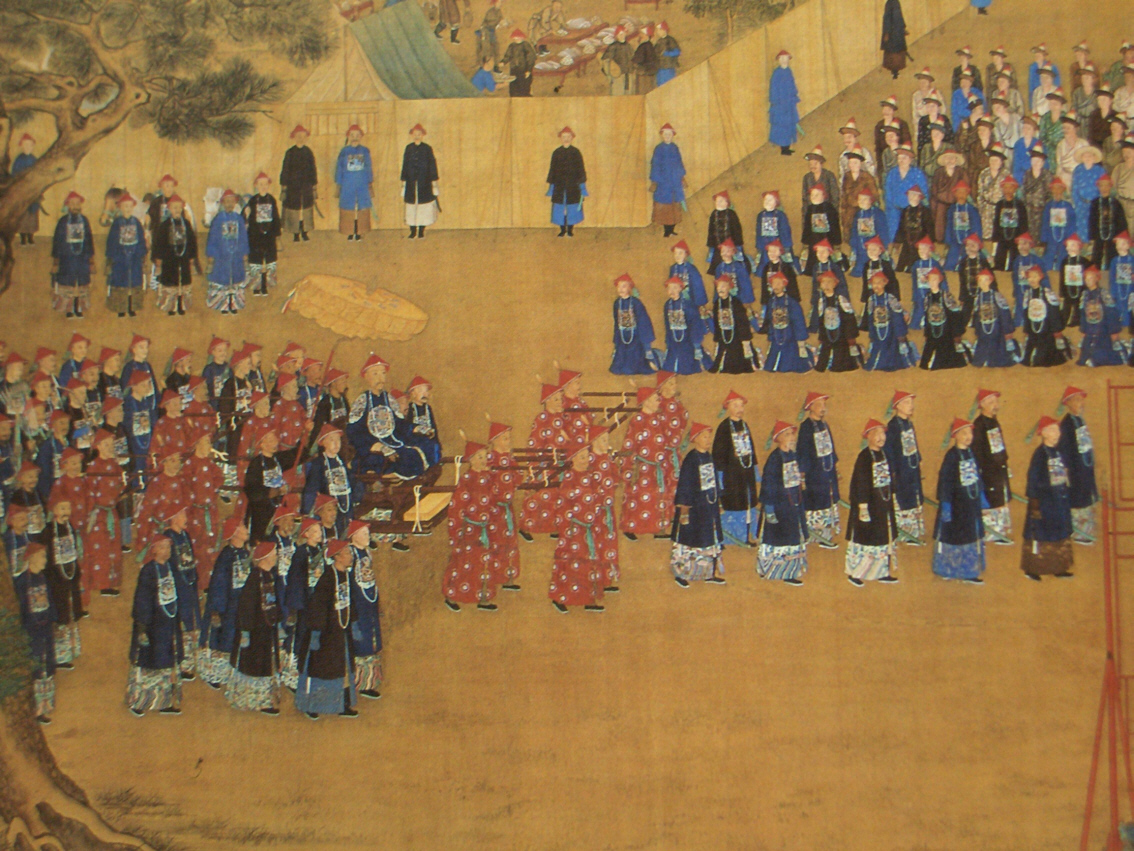
The touring Chengde.

In 1703, Chengde was made the summer residence of the Qing regime. Constructed throughout the eighteenth century, the Mountain Resort was used by the later rulers. The site is currently an UNESCO World Heritage Site. Since the seat of government followed the rulers, Chengde was a political center of the Chinese empire during these times.

The city of Jehol—an early romanization of Rehe via the French transcription of the northern suffix ér as eul—reached its height in the late 1700s. The great Putuo Zongcheng Temple, loosely based on the Potala in Lhasa, was completed after just four years of work in 1771. It was heavily decorated with gold and the emperor worshipped in the Golden Pavilion. In the temple itself was a bronze-gilt statue of Tsongkhapa, the Reformer of the Gelugpa sect.

It was in the Mountain Resort that Xianfeng Emperor signed the First Convention of Peking in October 1860. Under the early Beiyang Republic of China, Chengde was the capital of Rehe Province. From 1933 to 1945 the city was under Japanese occupation as a part of the Manchurian puppet state. After the Sino-American defeat of the Japanese, the victorious Kuomintang government regained jurisdiction. In 1948, the People's Liberation Army took control of Chengde. It would remain a part of Rehe until 1955, when the province was abolished, and the city was incorporated into Hebei.

In 2018 the Pope established the Diocese of Chengde that consists of 25,000 Catholics including seven priests living in 12 parishes.

== Geography ==
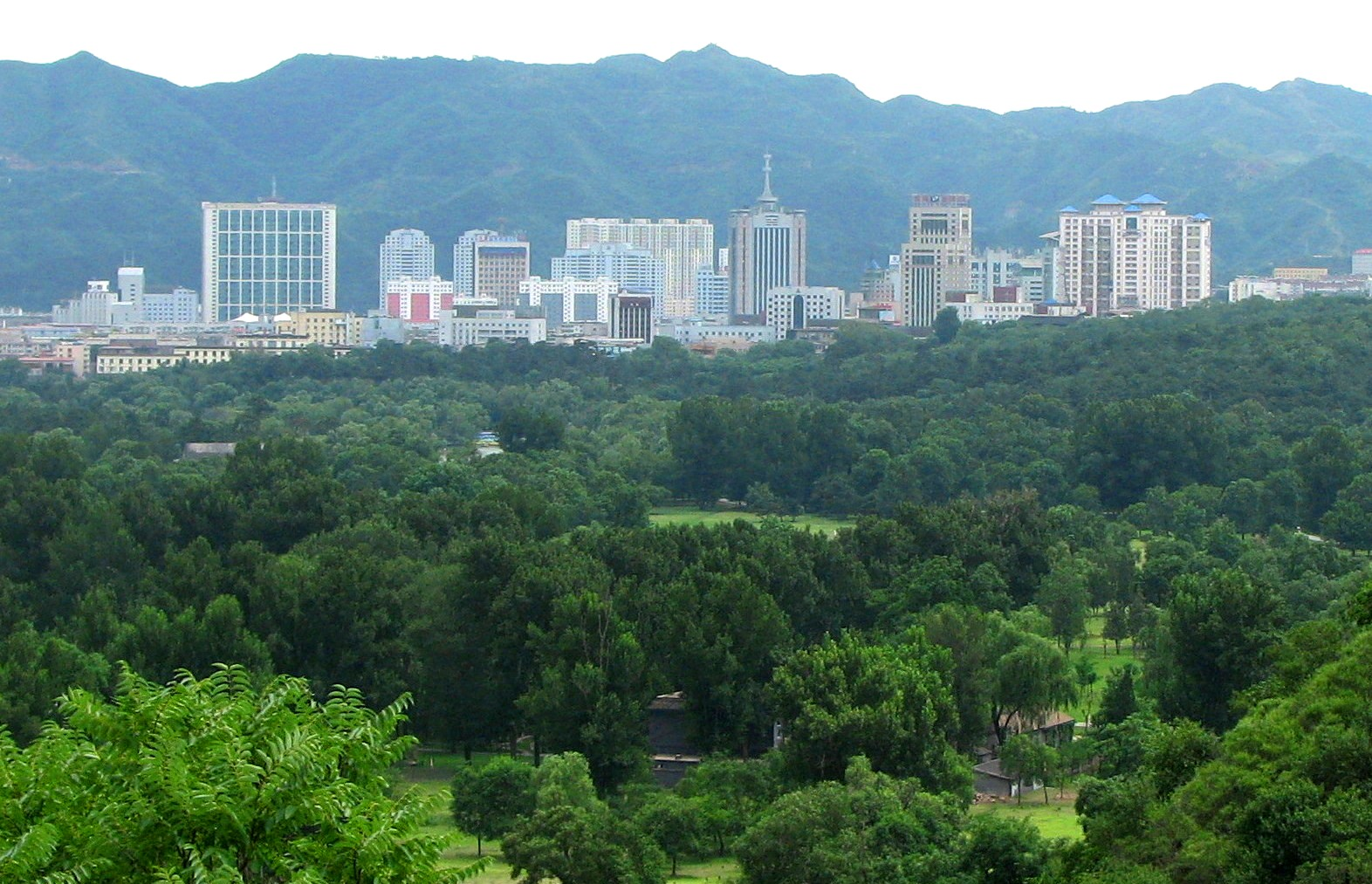
View of Chengde from the Mountain Resort.

Chengde is located in the northeastern portion of Hebei, with latitude 40° 12'－42° 37' N, and longitude 115° 54'－119° 15' E, and contains the northernmost point in the province. It borders Inner Mongolia, Liaoning, Beijing, and Tianjin. Neighbouring prefecture-level provincial cities are Qinhuangdao and Tangshan on the Bohai Gulf, and land-locked Zhangjiakou. Due to its Liaoning border, it is often considered a part of both the North and Northeast China regions. From north to south the prefecture stretches 269 kilometres (167 mi), and from west to east 280 kilometres (174 mi), for a total area of 39,702.4 square kilometres (15,329.2 sq mi), thus occupying 21.2% of the total provincial area. It is by area the largest prefecture in the province, though as most of its terrain is mountainous, its population density is low.

The Jehol or Rehe ("Hot River"), which gave Chengde its former name, was so named because it did not freeze in winter. Most sections of the river's former course are now dry because of modern dams.

=== Climate ===
Chengde has a four-season, monsoon-influenced humid continental climate (Köppen Dwa), with widely varying conditions through the prefecture due to its size: winters are moderately long, cold and windy, but dry, and summers are hot and humid. Near the city, however, temperatures are much cooler than they are in Beijing, due to the higher elevation: the monthly 24-hour average temperature ranges from −9.3 °C (15.3 °F) in January to 24.2 °C (75.6 °F) in July, and the annual mean is 8.93 °C (48.1 °F). Spring warming is rapid, but dust storms can blow in from the Mongolian steppe; autumn cooling is similarly quick. Precipitation averages at about 504 millimetres (19.8 in) for the year, with more than two-thirds of it falling during the three summer months. With monthly percent possible sunshine ranging from 50% in July to 69% in October, the city receives 2,746 hours of sunshine annually.

Climate data for Chengde, elevation 422 m (1,385 ft), (1991–2020 normals, extremes 1951–present)
Month	Jan	Feb	Mar	Apr	May	Jun	Jul	Aug	Sep	Oct	Nov	Dec	Year
Record high °C (°F)	8.8 (47.8)	20.7 (69.3)	28.4 (83.1)	34.3 (93.7)	39.3 (102.7)	41.3 (106.3)	43.3 (109.9)	38.9 (102.0)	35.4 (95.7)	32.8 (91.0)	22.3 (72.1)	12.3 (54.1)	43.3 (109.9)
Mean daily maximum °C (°F)	−1.4 (29.5)	3.4 (38.1)	11.1 (52.0)	19.6 (67.3)	26.0 (78.8)	29.4 (84.9)	30.7 (87.3)	29.5 (85.1)	24.9 (76.8)	17.3 (63.1)	7.2 (45.0)	−0.5 (31.1)	16.4 (61.6)
Daily mean °C (°F)	−8.8 (16.2)	−4.4 (24.1)	3.3 (37.9)	11.8 (53.2)	18.2 (64.8)	22.1 (71.8)	24.3 (75.7)	22.9 (73.2)	17.1 (62.8)	9.3 (48.7)	0.0 (32.0)	−7.5 (18.5)	9.0 (48.2)
Mean daily minimum °C (°F)	−14.4 (6.1)	−10.6 (12.9)	−3.5 (25.7)	4.3 (39.7)	10.7 (51.3)	15.9 (60.6)	19.3 (66.7)	17.7 (63.9)	11.1 (52.0)	3.1 (37.6)	−5.4 (22.3)	−12.6 (9.3)	3.0 (37.3)
Record low °C (°F)	−27.2 (−17.0)	−23.7 (−10.7)	−20.0 (−4.0)	−8.7 (16.3)	−0.2 (31.6)	7.2 (45.0)	12.5 (54.5)	6.4 (43.5)	−0.1 (31.8)	−10.6 (12.9)	−18.8 (−1.8)	−24.7 (−12.5)	−27.2 (−17.0)
Average precipitation mm (inches)	1.5 (0.06)	3.9 (0.15)	7.9 (0.31)	22.7 (0.89)	49.5 (1.95)	95.7 (3.77)	141.1 (5.56)	101.5 (4.00)	49.4 (1.94)	30.9 (1.22)	10.4 (0.41)	2.0 (0.08)	516.5 (20.34)
Average precipitation days (≥ 0.1 mm)	1.4	1.9	3.1	4.8	7.5	12.0	13.3	10.7	7.7	5.1	3.1	1.6	72.2
Average snowy days	2.7	2.7	2.7	0.8	0	0	0	0	0	0.4	2.6	2.5	14.4
Average relative humidity (%)	52	46	41	40	47	62	73	74	70	61	58	55	57
Mean monthly sunshine hours	196.2	198.6	234.9	243.2	265.2	221.3	197.0	212.3	217.2	215.2	182.1	182.0	2,565.2
Percentage possible sunshine	66	66	63	61	59	49	43	50	59	63	62	64	59
Source: China Meteorological Administration all-time extreme temperature

=== Administrative divisions ===
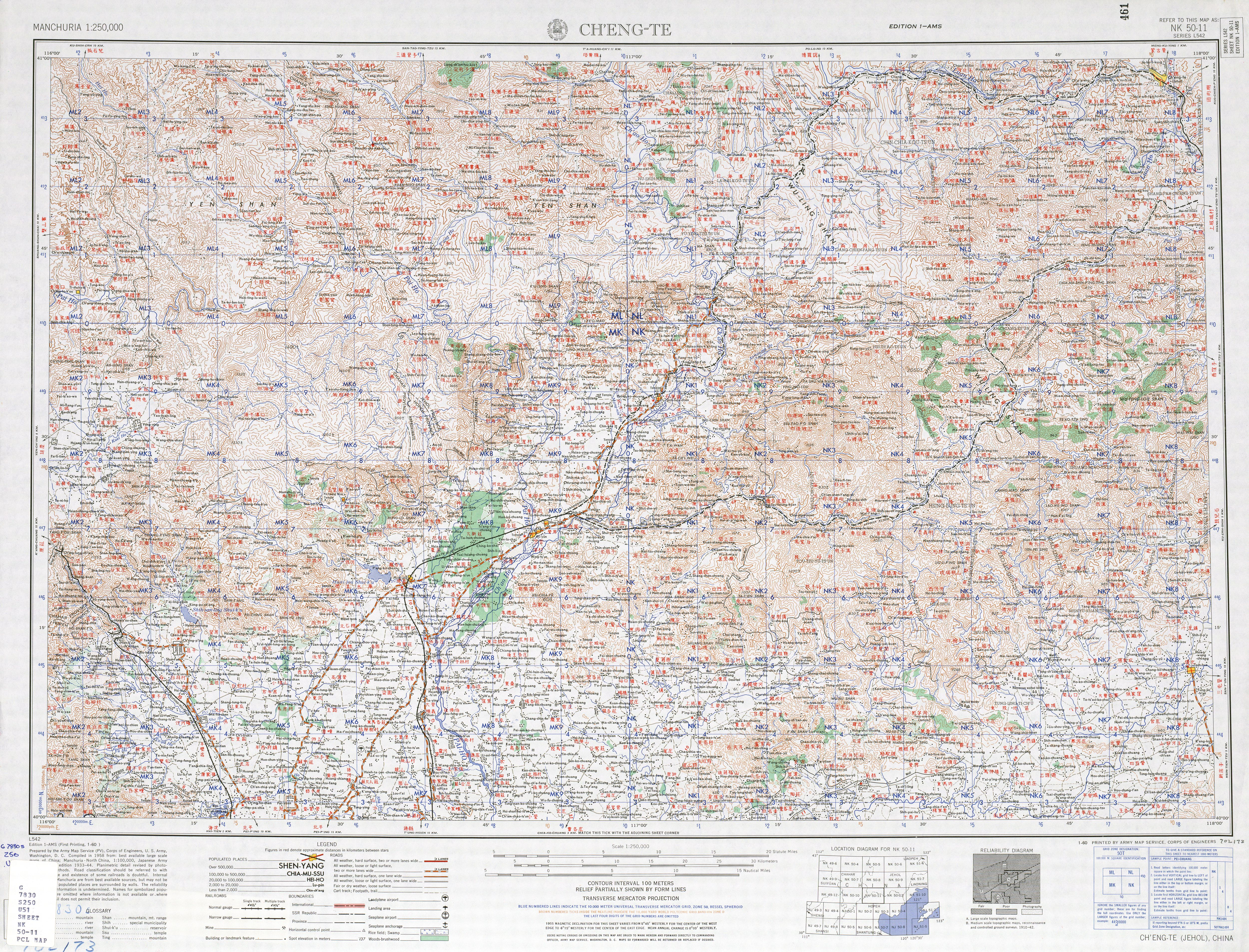
Map including Chengde (labeled as 承德 Ch'eng-te (Jehol)) (AMS, 1958)

Chengde comprises:

Map
Name	Hanzi	Hanyu Pinyin	Population (2004 est.)	Area (km^{2})	Density (/km^{2})
Shuangqiao District	双桥区	Shuāngqiáo Qū	290,000	311	932
Shuangluan District	双滦区	Shuāngluán Qū	100,000	250	400
Yingshouyingzi Mining District	鹰手营子 矿区	Yīngshǒuyíngzi; Kuàngqū	70,000	148	473
Pingquan City	平泉市	Píngquán Shì	470,000	3,297	143
Chengde County	承德县	Chéngdé Xiàn	470,000	3,990	118
Xinglong County	兴隆县	Xīnglóng Xiàn	320,000	3,116	103
Luanping County	滦平县	Luánpíng Xiàn	320,000	3,195	100
Longhua County	隆化县	Lónghuà Xiàn	420,000	5,474	77
Fengning Manchu; Autonomous County	丰宁满族 自治县	Fēngníng Mǎnzú; Zìzhìxiàn	380,000	8,747	43
Kuancheng Manchu; Autonomous County	宽城满族 自治县	Kuānchéng Mǎnzú; Zìzhìxiàn	230,000	1,933	119
Weichang Manchu and Mongol Autonomous County	围场满族 蒙古族自治县	Wéichǎng Mǎnzú; Měnggǔzú Zìzhìxiàn	520,000	9,058	57

== Sport ==
The first ever bandy match in China was organised in Chengde in January 2015 and was played between the Russian and Swedish top clubs Baykal-Energiya and Sandviken. Chengde city was one of the initiators when the China Bandy Federation was founded in December 2014. The city hosted the 2018 Women's Bandy World Championship. While the record number of participants in previous Women's Bandy World Championships was 7, the organisers had thought out measures with the goal to attract 12 participating countries. However, in the end 8 teams participated.

== Religion ==
Chengde is the seat of the Catholic Diocese of Chengde.

== Transport ==
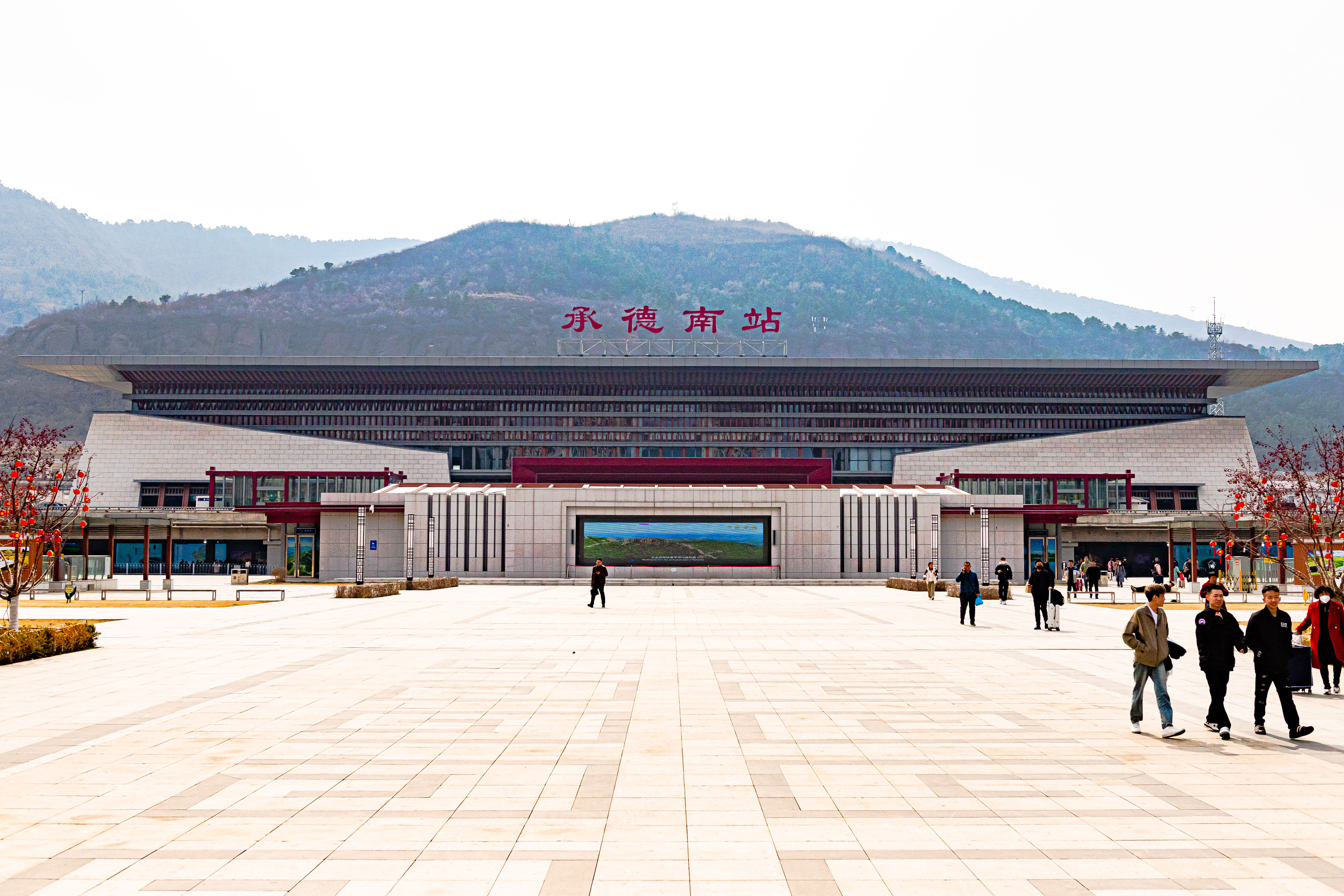
Chengde South railway station on the Beijing–Harbin high-speed railway

With road and railroad links to Beijing, Chengde has developed into a distribution hub, and its economy is growing rapidly. The newly built Jingcheng Expressway connects Chengde directly to central Beijing, and more freeways are planned for the city. The city's new airport was opened on 31 May 2017. It is located 19.5 kilometres (12.1 mi) northeast of the city center in Tougou Town, Chengde County.

== Sights ==
Qing dynasty map of Chengde Mountain Resort.

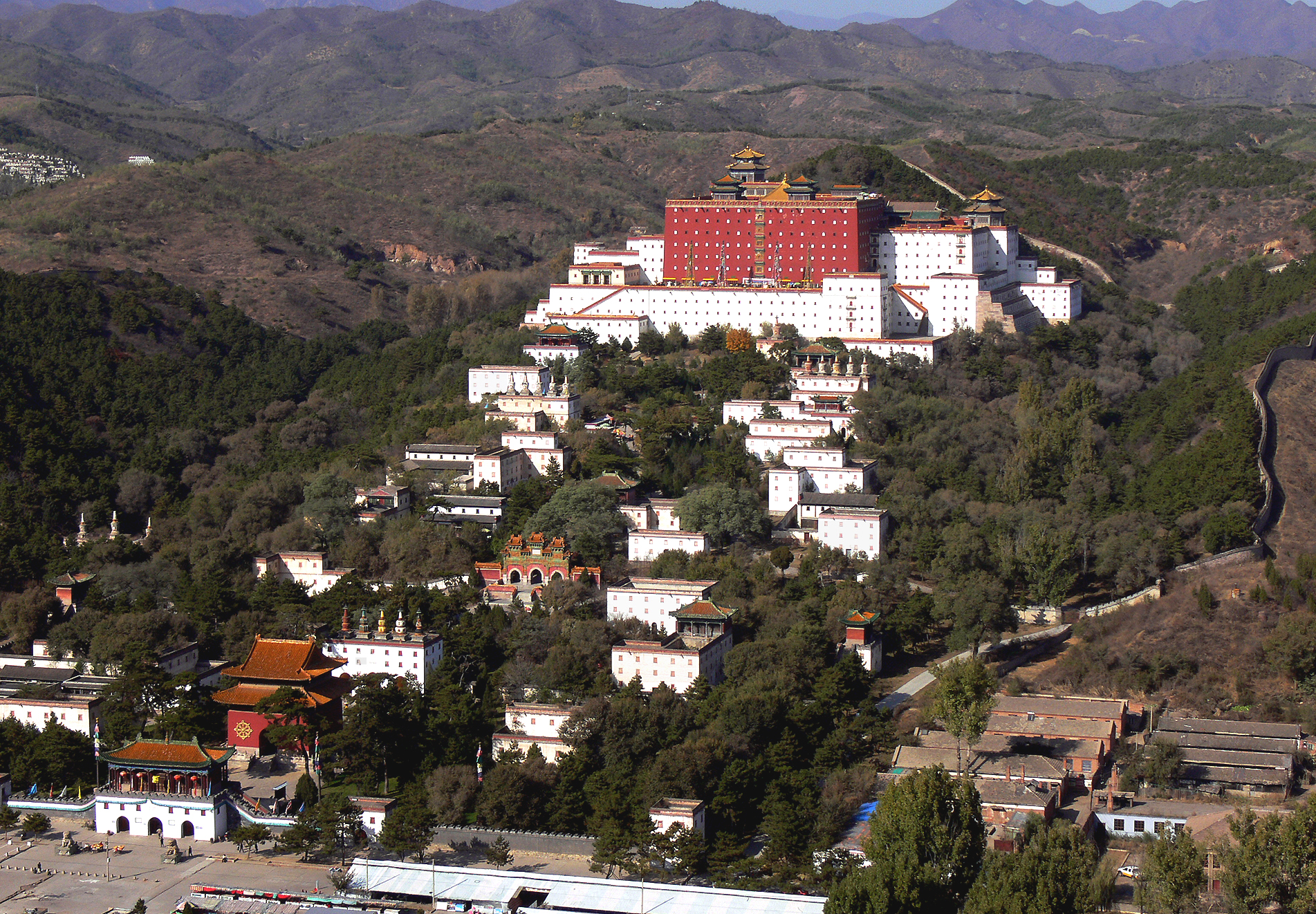
The Putuo Zongcheng Temple complex, completed in 1771 during the reign of the Qianlong Emperor.

The project of building Chengde Mountain Resort started in 1703 and finished in 1790. The whole mountain resort covers an area 5,640,000 square meters. It is the largest royal garden in China. The wall of the mountain resort is over 10,000 meters in length. In summers, emperors of the Qing dynasty came to the mountain resort to relax themselves and escape from the high temperature in Beijing.

The whole Resort can be divided into three areas which are lakes area, plains area and hills area. The lakes area, which includes 8 lakes, covers an area of 496,000 square meters. The plains area covers an area of 607,000 square meters. The emperors held horse races and hunted in the area. The largest area of the three is the hills area. It covers an area of 4,435,000 square meters. Hundreds of palaces and temples were built on the hills in this area.

The elaborate Mountain Resort features large parks with lakes, pagodas, and palaces ringed by a wall. Outside the wall are the Eight Outer Temples (外八庙), built in varying architectural styles drawn from throughout China. One of the best-known of these is the Putuo Zongcheng Temple, built to resemble the Potala Palace in Lhasa, Tibet. The resort and outlying temples were made a UNESCO World Heritage Site in 1994. The nearby Puning Temple, built in 1755, houses the world's tallest wooden statue of the Bodhisattva Avalokiteśvara.

Another popular attraction of the Chengde area is Sledgehammer Peak (磬锤峰), a large rock formation in the shape of an inverted sledgehammer. A variety of other mountains, valleys, and grasslands lie within the borders of the city.

== Gallery ==
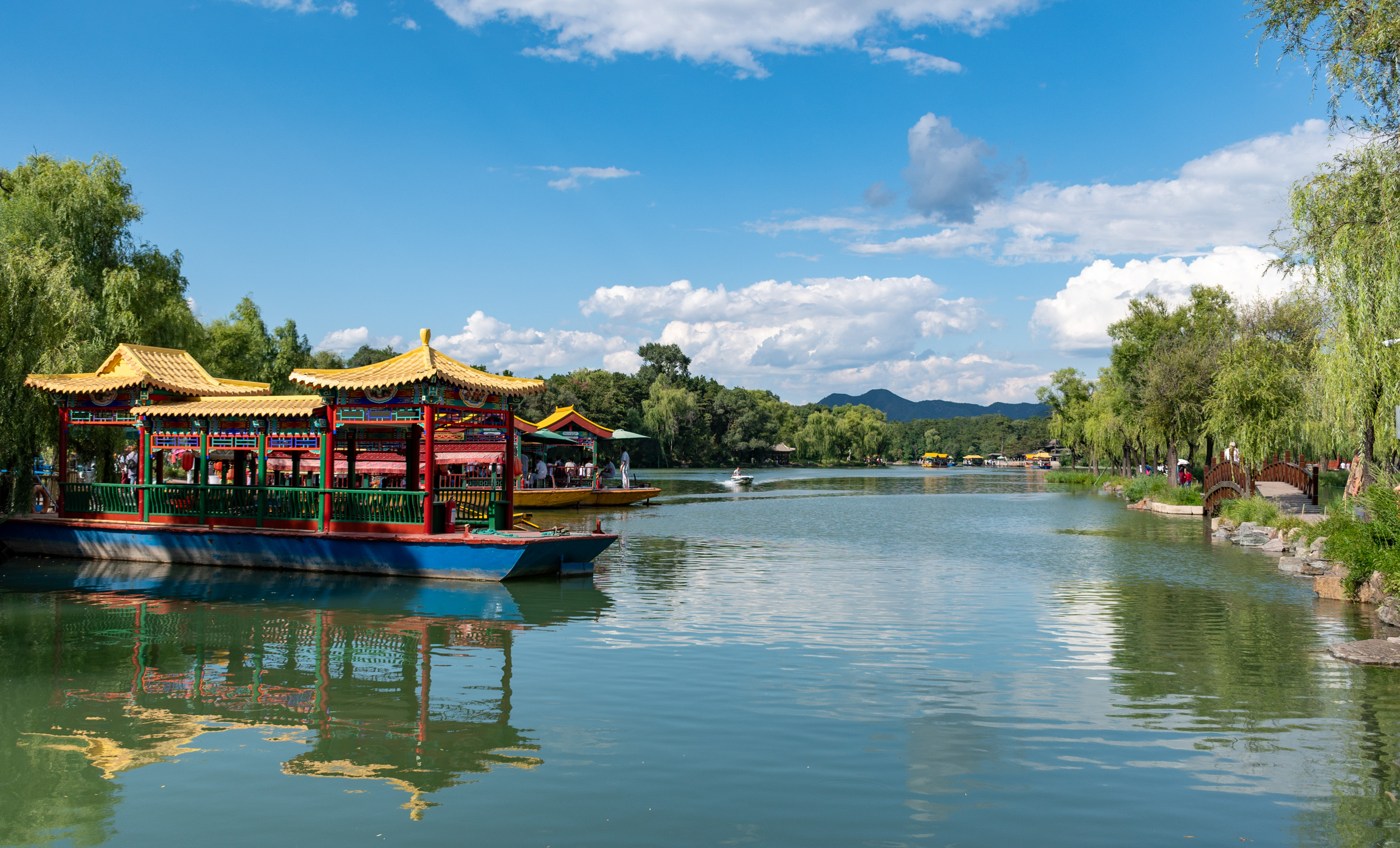
Mountain Resort

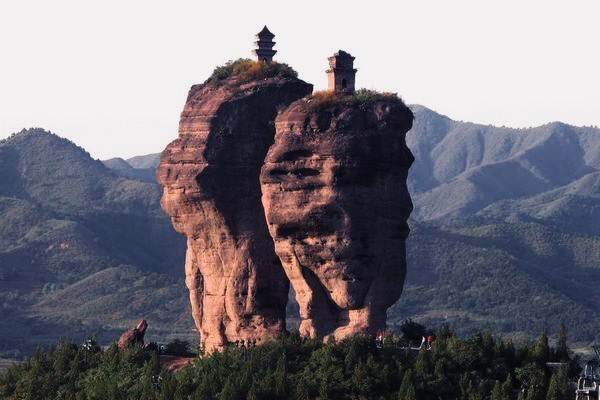
Double towers mountain in Chengde city

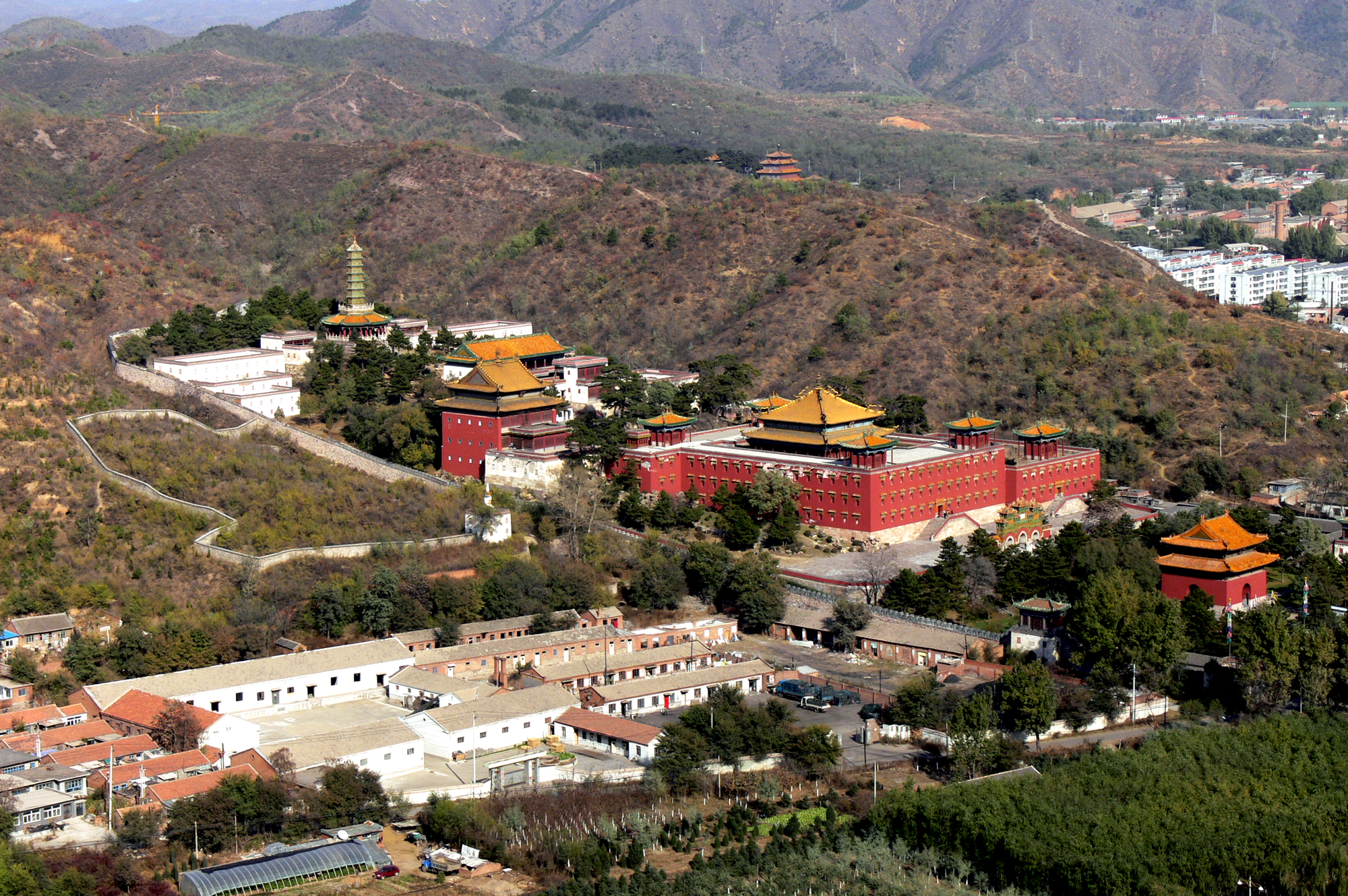
Xumi Fushou Temple

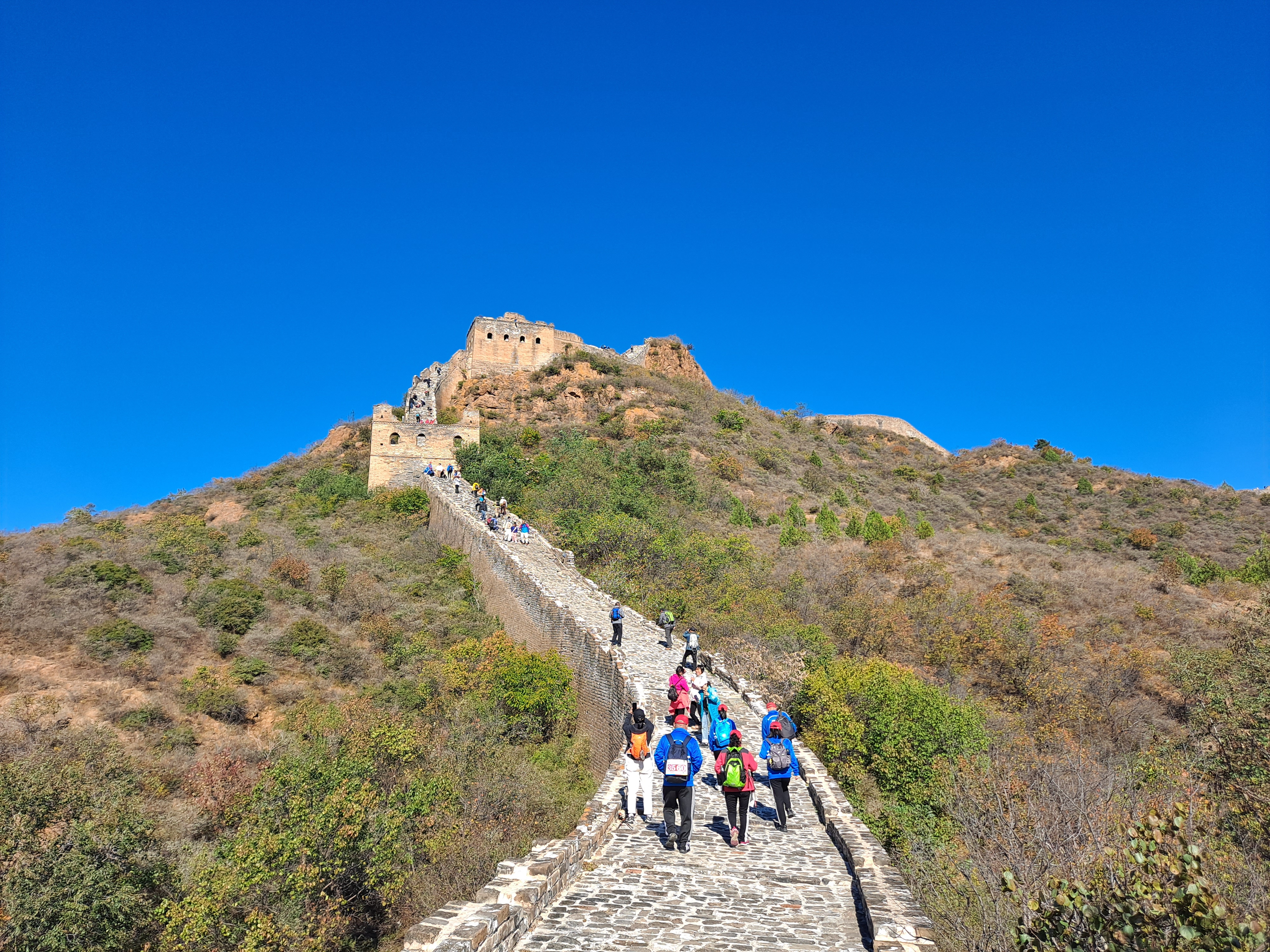
Jinshanling is a section of the Great Wall of China located in the mountainous area in Luanping County, Chengde

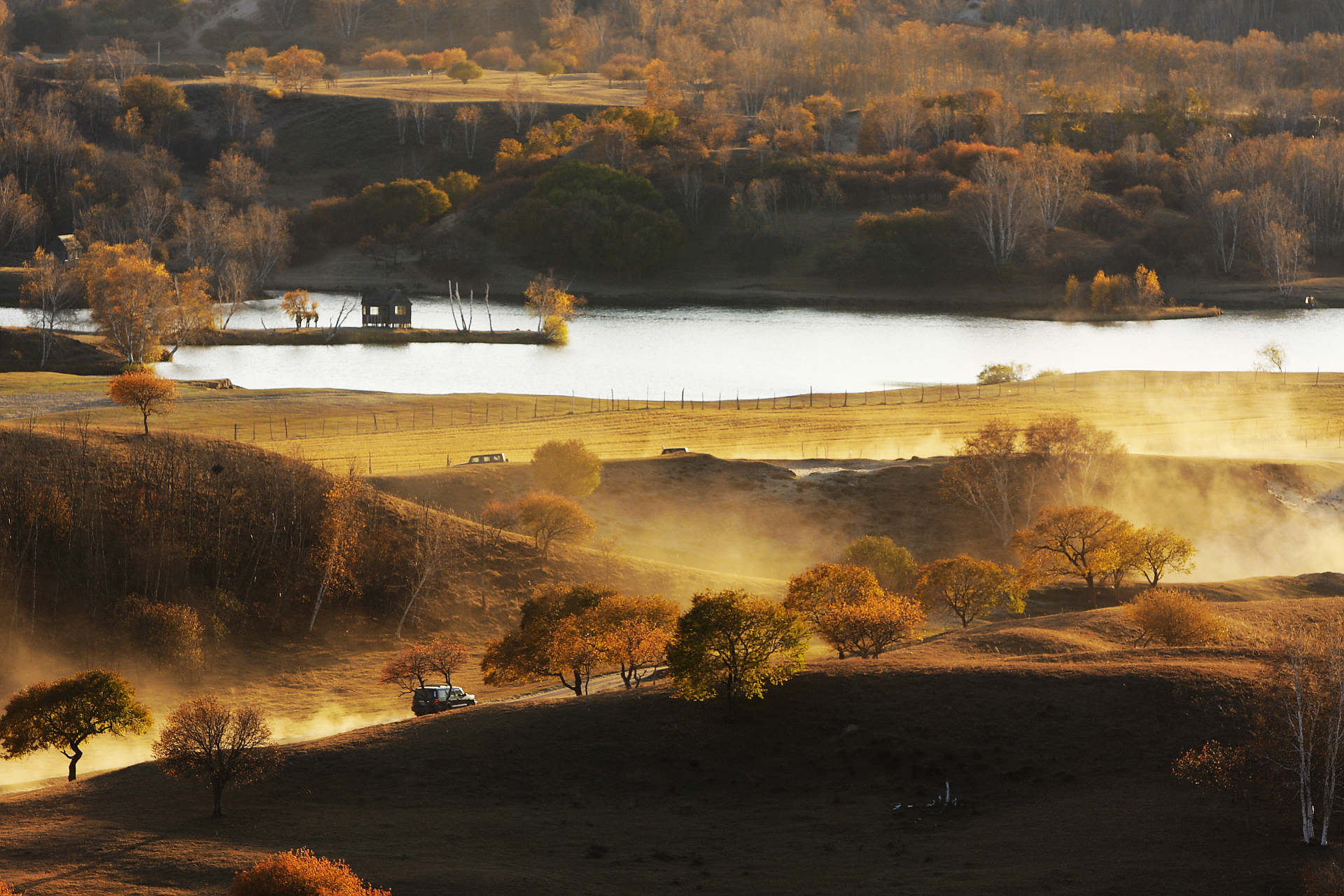
Mulan imperial hunting ground in Weichang County, northern Chengde

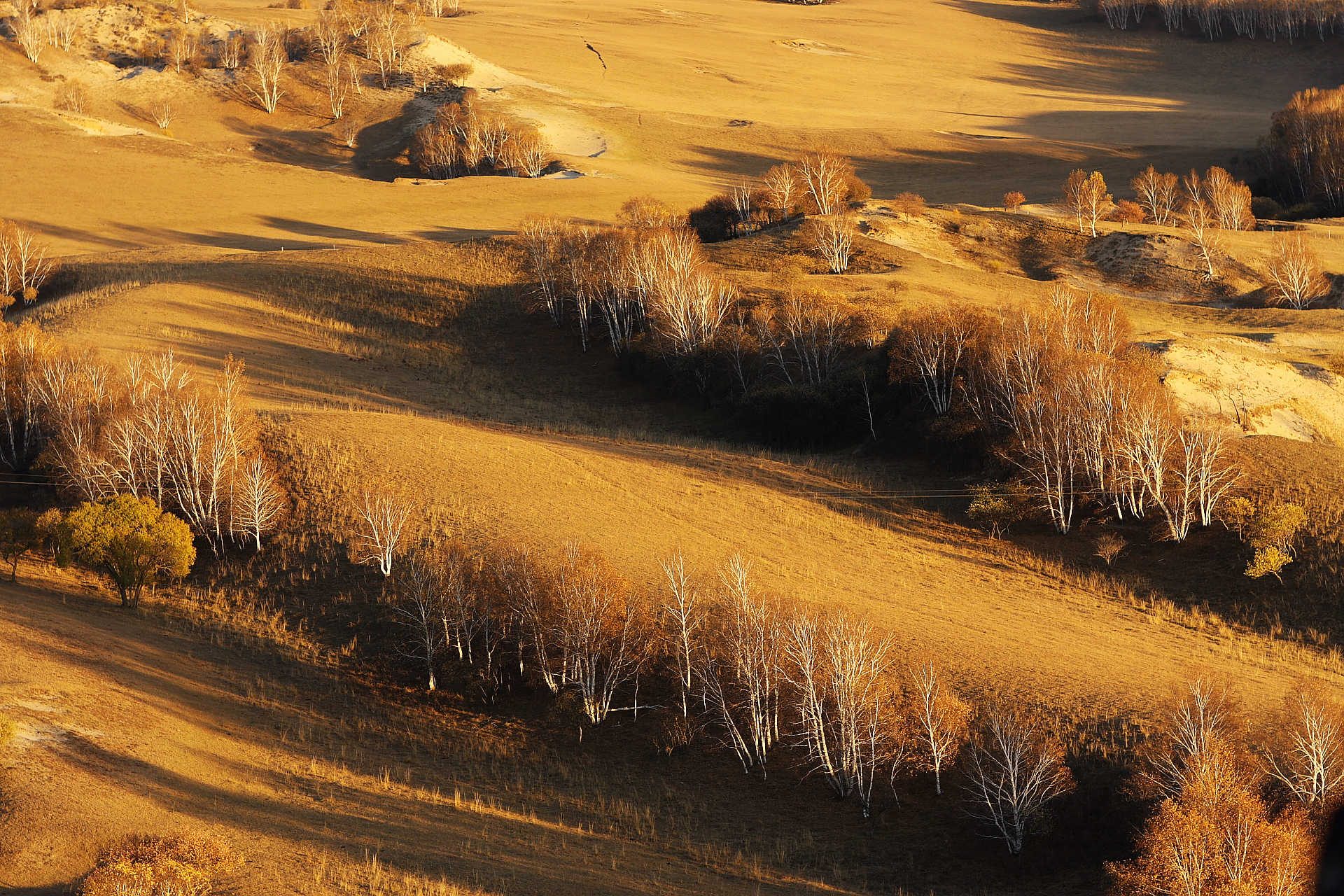
Mulan imperial hunting ground

== Sister cities ==
Chengde has city partnerships with the following locations:

- Santo André, São Paulo, Brazil
- Takasaki, Gunma, Japan
- Dakota County, Minnesota, United States
- Kashiwa, Chiba, Japan
