= No. 2 Middle School =

No. 2 Middle School or No. 2 High School (Chinese: 第二中学) may refer to any of these secondary schools in mainland China:

- Ma'anshan No.2 High School in Ma'anshan, Anhui
- Guangzhou No.2 High School in Guangzhou, Guangdong
- Nanning No.2 High School in Nanning, Guangxi
- Hengshui No. 2 High School in Hengshui, Hebei
- Loudi No. 2 High School in Loudi, Henan
- Ruzhou No. 2 High School in Pingdingshan, Henan
- Harbin No. 2 Korean Middle School in Harbin, Heilongjiang
- Hohhot No.2 Middle School in Hohhot, Inner Mongolia
- Changzhou No. 2 High School in Changzhou, Jiangsu
- Qingdao No. 2 Middle School Shandong in Qingdao, Shandong
- No. 2 High School of East China Normal University in Shanghai
- Shanghai No. 2 High School in Shanghai
- Hangzhou No. 2 High School in Hangzhou, Zhejiang

== See also ==
- No. 1 Middle School (disambiguation)
