= Fucheng =

Fucheng may refer to the following settlements in the People's Republic of China:

- Fucheng County (阜城县), of Hengshui, Hebei
- Fucheng District (涪城区), Mianyang, Sichuan
- Fucheng Subdistrict (福城街道), Longhua District, Shenzhen

Towns

- Fucheng, Beihai (福成镇), in Yinhai District, Beihai, Guangxi
- Fucheng, Fucheng County (阜城镇), Hebei
- Fucheng, Jiangsu (阜城镇), in Funing County

Written as "府城镇":

- Fucheng, Anhui
- Fucheng, Hainan
- Fucheng, Wuming County, Guangxi
- Fucheng, Anze County, Shanxi

Written as "附城镇":

- Fucheng, Gansu, in Kangle County
- Fucheng, Leizhou, Guangdong
- Fucheng, Haifeng County, Guangdong
- Fucheng, Jincheng, in Lingchuan County, Shanxi
