= Hengshui railway station =

Railway station in Hengshui, China

Hengshui 衡水
- Station building in September 2026

General information
- Location: Taocheng District, Hengshui, Hebei; China
- Coordinates: 37°44′37″N 115°41′41″E
- Operator: Beijing Railway Bureau, China Railway Corporation
- Lines: Jingjiu Railway, Shide Railway
- Platforms: 3

History
- Opened: 1940
Location
- Location within Hebei

The Hengshui railway station (Chinese: 衡水站; pinyin: Héngshǔi zhàn) is a railway station of Jingjiu Railway, Shide Railway that located in Hengshui, Hebei province, China.

== History ==
The station opened in 1940.

Preceding station	China Railway	Following station
Shenzhou (Hebei) towards Beijing West	Beijing–Kowloon railway	Zaoqiang towards Hung Hom
