= Cuijiamiao =

Cuijiamiao 崔家庙镇
- Town
- Cuījiāmiào Zhèn
- Location in Hebei Location in China
- Coordinates: 37°55′14″N 116°25′05″E
- Country: People's Republic of China
- Province: Hebei
- Prefecture-level city: Hengshui
- County: Fucheng

Area
  - Total: 100.6 km^{2} (38.8 sq mi)

Population (2010)
  - Total: 40,917
  - Density: 406.9/km^{2} (1,054/sq mi)
- Time zone: UTC+8 (China Standard)

Cuijiamiao (Chinese: 崔家庙镇; pinyin: Cuījiāmiào Zhèn) is a town located in Fucheng County, Hengshui, Hebei, China. According to the 2010 census, Cuijiamiao had a population of 40,917, including 20,823 males and 20,094 females. The population was distributed as follows: 7,519 people aged under 14, 30,006 people aged between 15 and 64, and 3,392 people aged over 65.

== See also ==
- List of township-level divisions of Hebei
