= Daying, Zaoqiang County =

Daying 大营镇
- Town
- Dàyíng Zhèn
- Location in Hebei Location in China
- Coordinates: 37°18′16″N 115°43′10″E
- Country: People's Republic of China
- Province: Hebei
- Prefecture-level city: Hengshui
- County: Zaoqiang

Area
  - Total: 139.9 km^{2} (54.0 sq mi)

Population (2010)
  - Total: 76,800
  - Density: 548.9/km^{2} (1,422/sq mi)
- Time zone: UTC+8 (China Standard)

Daying (Chinese: 大营镇; pinyin: Dàyíng Zhèn) is a town located in Zaoqiang County, Hengshui, Hebei, China. According to the 2010 census, Daying had a population of 76,800, including 38,992 males and 37,808 females. The population was distributed as follows: 16,129 people aged under 14, 55,816 people aged between 15 and 64, and 4,855 people aged over 65.

== See also ==
- List of township-level divisions of Hebei
