= Dazita Township =

Dazita Township 大紫塔乡
- Rural Township
- Dàzǐtǎ Xiāng
- Location in Hebei Location in China
- Coordinates: 37°41′53″N 115°55′32″E
- Country: People's Republic of China
- Province: Hebei
- Prefecture-level city: Hengshui
- County: Wuyi

Area
  - Total: 67.31 km^{2} (25.99 sq mi)

Population (2010)
  - Total: 18,108
  - Density: 269/km^{2} (700/sq mi)
- Time zone: UTC+8 (China Standard)

Dazita Township (Chinese: 大紫塔乡; pinyin: Dàzǐtǎ Xiāng) is a rural township located in Wuyi County, Hengshui, Hebei, China. According to the 2010 census, Dazita Township had a population of 18,108, including 9,003 males and 9,105 females. The population was distributed as follows: 3,015 people aged under 14, 13,269 people aged between 15 and 64, and 1,824 people aged over 65.

== See also ==
- List of township-level divisions of Hebei
