= Xiakou, Fucheng County =

Xiakou 霞口镇
- Town
- Location in Hebei
- Coordinates: 37°58′13″N 116°33′20″E
- Country: People's Republic of China
- Province: Hebei
- Prefecture-level city: Hengshui
- County: Fucheng County
- Time zone: UTC+8 (China Standard)

Xiakou (Chinese: 霞口; pinyin: Xiákǒu) is a town under the administration of Fucheng County, Hebei, China. As of 2018, it has 56 villages under its administration.
