= Daguanting =

Daguanting 大官亭镇
- Town
- Dàguāntíng Zhèn
- Location in Hebei Location in China
- Coordinates: 38°19′58″N 115°45′30″E
- Country: People's Republic of China
- Province: Hebei
- Prefecture-level city: Hengshui
- County: Raoyang

Area
  - Total: 83.22 km^{2} (32.13 sq mi)

Population (2010)
  - Total: 39,671
  - Density: 476.7/km^{2} (1,235/sq mi)
- Time zone: UTC+8 (China Standard)

Daguanting (Chinese: 大官亭镇; pinyin: Dàguāntíng Zhèn) is a town located in Raoyang County, Hengshui, Hebei, China. According to the 2010 census, Daguanting had a population of 39,671, including 20,296 males and 19,375 females. The population was distributed as follows: 5,467 people aged under 14, 30,196 people aged between 15 and 64, and 4,008 people aged over 65.

== See also ==
- List of township-level divisions of Hebei
