= Dayincun =

Dayincun 大尹村镇
- Town
- Dàyĭncūn Zhèn
- Location in Hebei Location in China
- Coordinates: 38°18′45″N 115°48′43″E
- Country: People's Republic of China
- Province: Hebei
- Prefecture-level city: Hengshui
- County: Raoyang

Area
  - Total: 43.20 km^{2} (16.68 sq mi)

Population (2010)
  - Total: 23,133
  - Density: 535.5/km^{2} (1,387/sq mi)
- Time zone: UTC+8 (China Standard)

Dayincun (Chinese: 大尹村镇; pinyin: Dàyĭncūn Zhèn) is a town located in Raoyang County, Hengshui, Hebei, China. According to the 2010 census, Dayincun had a population of 23,133, including 11,660 males and 11,473 females. The population was distributed as follows: 3,177 people aged under 14, 17,710 people aged between 15 and 64, and 2,246 people aged over 65.

== See also ==
- List of township-level divisions of Hebei
