= Hengshui High School =

Hebei Hengshui High School
- 河北衡水中学

Location
- Taocheng District; Hengshui, Hebei Province; China; 37.7168°N 115.7048°E

Information
- Type: Public
- Motto: pursue excellence (追求卓越)
- Established: 1951
- Principal: Wang Jianyong (王建勇)
- Staff: over 600
- Enrollment: over 10,000
- Website: hbhszx.cn

Hebei Hengshui High School (Chinese: 河北衡水中学) is a municipal public high school in Hengshui, Hebei, China. It was established in 1951.

Students in Hengshui High School must obey a strict set of rules and regulations. Students are all required to study more than 15 hours per day and almost 7 days per week. International media outlets have remarked on how the school is often compared to a prison camp and how its military-style management of students has been proven to produce excellent results.

As of 2015, of all existing high schools in China, Hengshui High had the highest number of students gaining admission to the highest ranked universities in Mainland China. Hengshui High opened branch schools in various provinces. Parents have criticized the school's methods, believing they are overly harsh.

== School life ==
=== Curriculum ===
Hengshui High School strictly enforces the curriculum for students. Students wake up at 5:30 AM every day and start housekeeping before starting running exercises at 5:40 AM on the playground. Morning reading starts after the running exercise, and breakfast is served to the students in batches at 6:30 AM. Students have early preparations for self-study after breakfast, and then they start class. Each class lasts for 40 minutes. There are five classes in the morning and an inter-class exercise during the third class. Lunch break is from 12:45 PM to 1:45 PM, and after lunch, five classes are held in the afternoon. After the afternoon classes, students will have dinner, and they watch the news from 6:50 PM to 7:10 PM. There are three lessons in the evening for self-study, ending at 9:50 PM. At 10:10 PM, students are to go to bed. The start time of each class and the two minute period before bedtime are both preparation times. An "entry status" is required, in which students are expected to follow the school's restrictive rule of conduct. For example, two minutes before the class starts, no jokes are to be made, no water is to be consumed, and two minutes before bedtime, students must lie in bed and enter a state of sleep. Under the pressure of the Hebei Provincial Department of Education, the schedule of Hengshui High School in 2022 has been adjusted to have waking times set at 6:30 AM and bedtime set at 10:30 PM. However, the daily study time of students has not been affected.

=== School assignment and exams ===
Hengshui High School students are told to "regard self-study as exams, and regard exams as the Gaokao". The curriculum has a comprehensive test every Sunday, and every month there is a large-scale research exam held with difficulty equivalent to that of the Gaokao. Both small tests and large-scale tests rank students and classes. School assignments and examination papers are written by teaching staff.

=== Holidays ===
During a semester, students take a vacation every two or three weeks, and the time can range from about one day in the first year to one night in the third year. During the COVID-19 pandemic, the school was closed for several months, so there were no regular holidays.

=== Featured events ===
The special activities of Hengshui High School include the "80 Chinese mile hiking" held in the first grade, the "coming-of-age ceremony" held in the second year, and the "100 day oath of the Gaokao" held in the third year, etc.

== See also ==
- Hengshui No. 2 High School
- Maotanchang High School
