= Hedong Subdistrict, Hengshui =

Hedong Subdistrict 河东街道
- Subdistrict
- Location in Hebei
- Coordinates: 37°43′34″N 115°42′12″E
- Country: People's Republic of China
- Province: Hebei
- Prefecture-level city: Hengshui
- District: Taocheng
- Village-level divisions: 14 residential communities 14 villages
- Elevation: 24 m (79 ft)
- Time zone: UTC+8 (China Standard)
- Area code: 0318

Hedong Subdistrict (simplified Chinese: 河东街道; traditional Chinese: 河東街道; pinyin: Hédōng Jiēdào; lit. 'river east') is a subdistrict of Taocheng District, located in the southeastern part of Hengshui, Hebei, People's Republic of China. As of 2018, it administers 14 residential communities (居委会) and 14 villages.

== See also ==
- List of township-level divisions of Hebei
