= Dongliman Township =

Dongliman Township 东里满乡
- Rural Township
- Dōnglĭmăn Xiāng
- Location in Hebei Location in China
- Coordinates: 38°07′45″N 115°35′20″E
- Country: People's Republic of China
- Province: Hebei
- Prefecture-level city: Hengshui
- County: Raoyang

Area
  - Total: 74.74 km^{2} (28.86 sq mi)

Population (2010)
  - Total: 36,994
  - Density: 495/km^{2} (1,280/sq mi)
- Time zone: UTC+8 (China Standard)

Dongliman Township (Chinese: 东里满乡; pinyin: Dōnglĭmăn Xiāng) is a rural township located in Raoyang County, Hengshui, Hebei, China. According to the 2010 census, Dongliman Township had a population of 36,994, including 18,960 males and 18,034 females. The population was distributed as follows: 4,853 people aged under 14, 27,688 people aged between 15 and 64, and 4,453 people aged over 65.

== See also ==
- List of township-level divisions of Hebei
