= Encha =

Encha 恩察镇
- Town
- Ēnchá Zhèn
- Location in Hebei Location in China
- Coordinates: 37°24′05″N 115°43′30″E
- Country: People's Republic of China
- Province: Hebei
- Prefecture-level city: Hengshui
- County: Zaoqiang

Area
  - Total: 33.66 km^{2} (13.00 sq mi)

Population (2010)
  - Total: 15,594
  - Density: 463.2/km^{2} (1,200/sq mi)
- Time zone: UTC+8 (China Standard)

Encha (Chinese: 恩察镇; pinyin: Ēnchá Zhèn) is a town located in Zaoqiang County, Hengshui, Hebei, China. According to the 2010 census, Encha had a population of 15,594, including 7,868 males and 7,726 females. The population was distributed as follows: 2,699 people aged under 14, 11,443 people aged between 15 and 64, and 1,452 people aged over 65.

== See also ==
- List of township-level divisions of Hebei
