= Beidai Township =

Beidai Township 北代乡
- Rural Township
- Běidài Xiāng
- Location in Hebei Location in China
- Coordinates: 38°03′23″N 115°55′24″E
- Country: People's Republic of China
- Province: Hebei
- Prefecture-level city: Hengshui
- County-level city: Wuqiang

Area
  - Total: 81.76 km^{2} (31.57 sq mi)

Population (2010)
  - Total: 29,437
  - Density: 360/km^{2} (930/sq mi)
- Time zone: UTC+8 (China Standard)

Beidai Township (Chinese: 北代乡; pinyin: Běidài Xiāng) is a rural township located in Wuqiang County, Hengshui, Hebei, China. According to the 2010 census, Beidai Township had a population of 29,437, including 15,099 males and 14,338 females. The population was distributed as follows: 5,352 people aged under 14, 21,518 people aged between 15 and 64, and 2,567 people aged over 65.

== See also ==
- List of township-level divisions of Hebei
