= Lubei Subdistrict, Hengshui =

Lubei Subdistrict 路北街道
- Subdistrict
- Interactive map of Lubei Subdistrict
- Coordinates: 37°45′02″N 115°40′40″E
- Country: People's Republic of China
- Province: Hebei
- Prefecture-level city: Hengshui
- District: Taocheng
- Village-level divisions: 10 residential communities
- Elevation: 22 m (72 ft)
- Time zone: UTC+8 (China Standard)
- Postal code: 053000
- Area code: 0318

Lubei Subdistrict (Chinese: 路北街道; pinyin: Lùběi Jiēdào; lit. 'north of the road') is a subdistrict of Taocheng District, Hengshui, Hebei, People's Republic of China, covering part of the northern portion of Hengshui's urban core As of 2011, it has 10 residential communities (社区) under its administration.

== See also ==
- List of township-level divisions of Hebei
