= Hengshui No. 2 High School =

Senior high school in Hengshui, Hebei, China

Hengshui No. 2 High School (Chinese: 衡水市第二中学; pinyin: Héngshuǐshì Dì'èr Zhōngxué) is a senior high school in Hengshui, Hebei, China. As part of its gaokao preparation, the school has its students do English reading and physical exercise. A Sohu report says the physical exercise is like a ceremony.

== See also ==
- Hengshui High School
