= Hengshui University =

University in Hengshui, Hebei, China

- 衡水学院
- Type: Public
- Established: 2004
- Location: Hengshui, Hebei, China
- Website: Hengshui University

Hengshui University (Chinese: 衡水学院; pinyin: Héngshuǐ Xuéyuàn) is a university in Hengshui, Hebei province, China, established by the provincial government.

== History ==
It used to be a two-year normal college, but it was elevated to a four-year comprehensive college or university in 2004 with the permission of the Ministry of Education.

Hengshui University's sporting facilities include a running track, a tennis court, ping-pong tables, basketball courts and badminton.

Hengshui Normal College was known as an example of mid-1980s medium density architecture. However, developments have occurred since mid-2003, including the construction of modern library facilities.
