= Wang Hsiao-ying =

Chinese politician

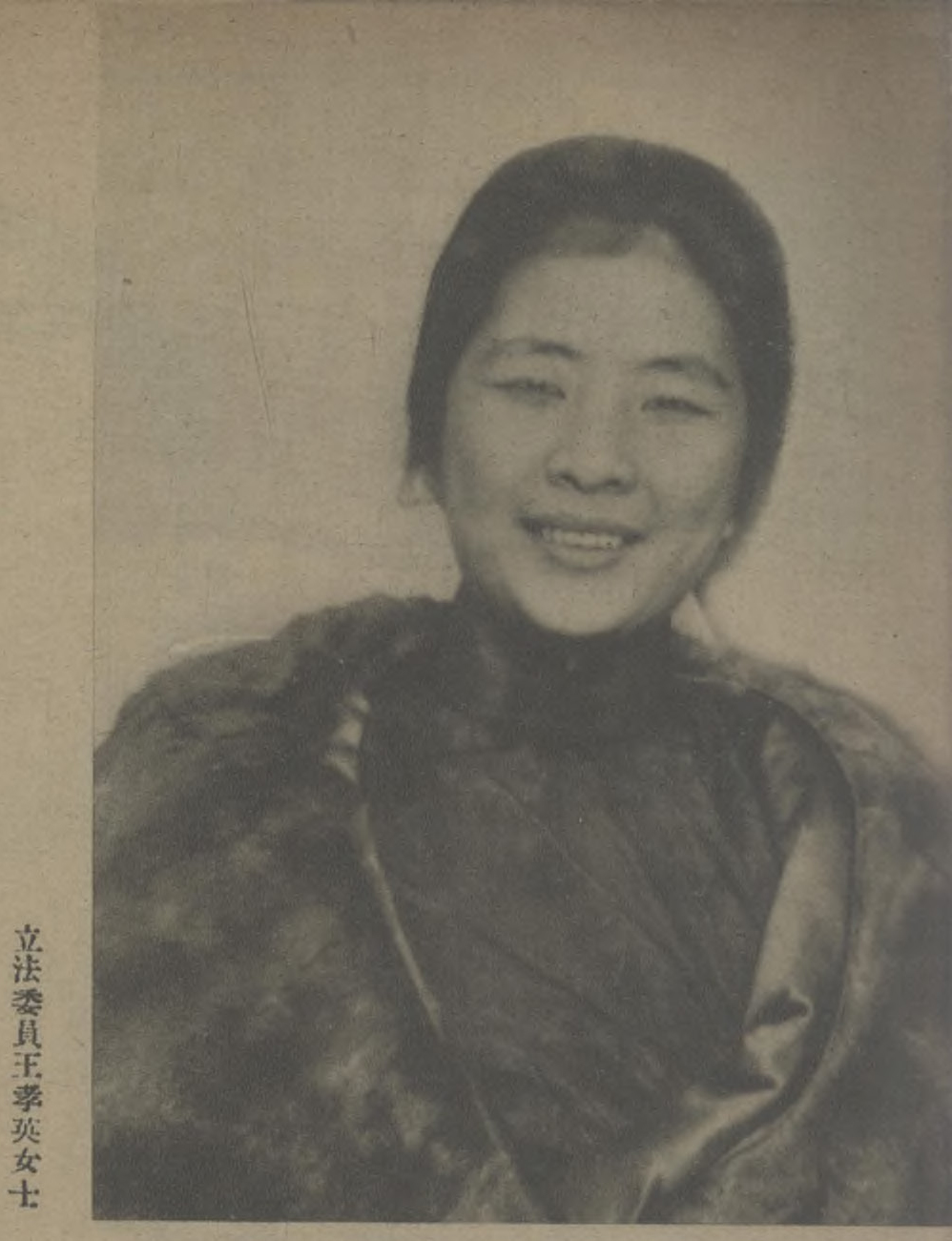

Member of the Legislative Yuan
- In office 1948–1990
- Constituency: Education
- In office 1935–1937 (appointed)

Personal details
- Born: 26 August 1899 Minhou County, Fuzhou, China
- Died: May 1990 (aged 90)

Wang Hsiao-ying (Chinese: 王孝英, 26 August 1899 – May 1990) was a Chinese educator and politician. She was among the first group of women elected to the Legislative Yuan in 1948.

== Biography ==
Wang was born in Minhou County in Fujian Province in 1899. A graduate of Peking Women's Normal University, she worked as a headmistress of Fujian Provincial Women's Normal School, Shanghai Liwuben Girls' Middle School and the Private Chinese Girls' Middle School. She married Li Dachao in Shanghai in 1929, where she served on the Education Committee of the British Concession. She also became a secretary of the Ministry of Transport. In 1935 she was appointed to the Legislative Yuan. When Li moved to Guangdong for work, she went to live with him in Guanzhou, where she became headmistress of Guangzhou No.2 Middle School and director of the Guangdong branch of the Wartime Child Care Association. After the end of World War II she served as a member of the Guangdong Provisional Senate.

Wang was a delegate to the 1946 Constituent National Assembly that drew up the constitution of the Republic of China. In the 1948 elections for the Legislative Yuan, she was elected to parliament from the seats reserved for women in education. She relocated to Taiwan during the Chinese Civil War, where she remained until her death in 1990.
