= Fucheng, Fucheng County =

Fucheng 阜城镇
- Town
- Fùchéng Zhèn
- Location in Hebei Location in China
- Coordinates: 37°52′05″N 116°08′56″E
- Country: People's Republic of China
- Province: Hebei
- Prefecture-level city: Hengshui
- County: Fucheng

Area
  - Total: 82.72 km^{2} (31.94 sq mi)

Population (2010)
  - Total: 68,649
  - Density: 829.9/km^{2} (2,149/sq mi)
- Time zone: UTC+8 (China Standard)

Fucheng (Chinese: 阜城镇; pinyin: Fùchéng Zhèn) is a town located in Fucheng County, Hengshui, Hebei, China. According to the 2010 census, Fucheng had a population of 68,649, including 34,040 males and 34,609 females. The population was distributed as follows: 13,453 people aged under 14, 50,488 people aged between 15 and 64, and 4,708 people aged over 65.

== See also ==
- List of township-level divisions of Hebei
