= Wuqiang County =

Wuqiang County 武强县
- County
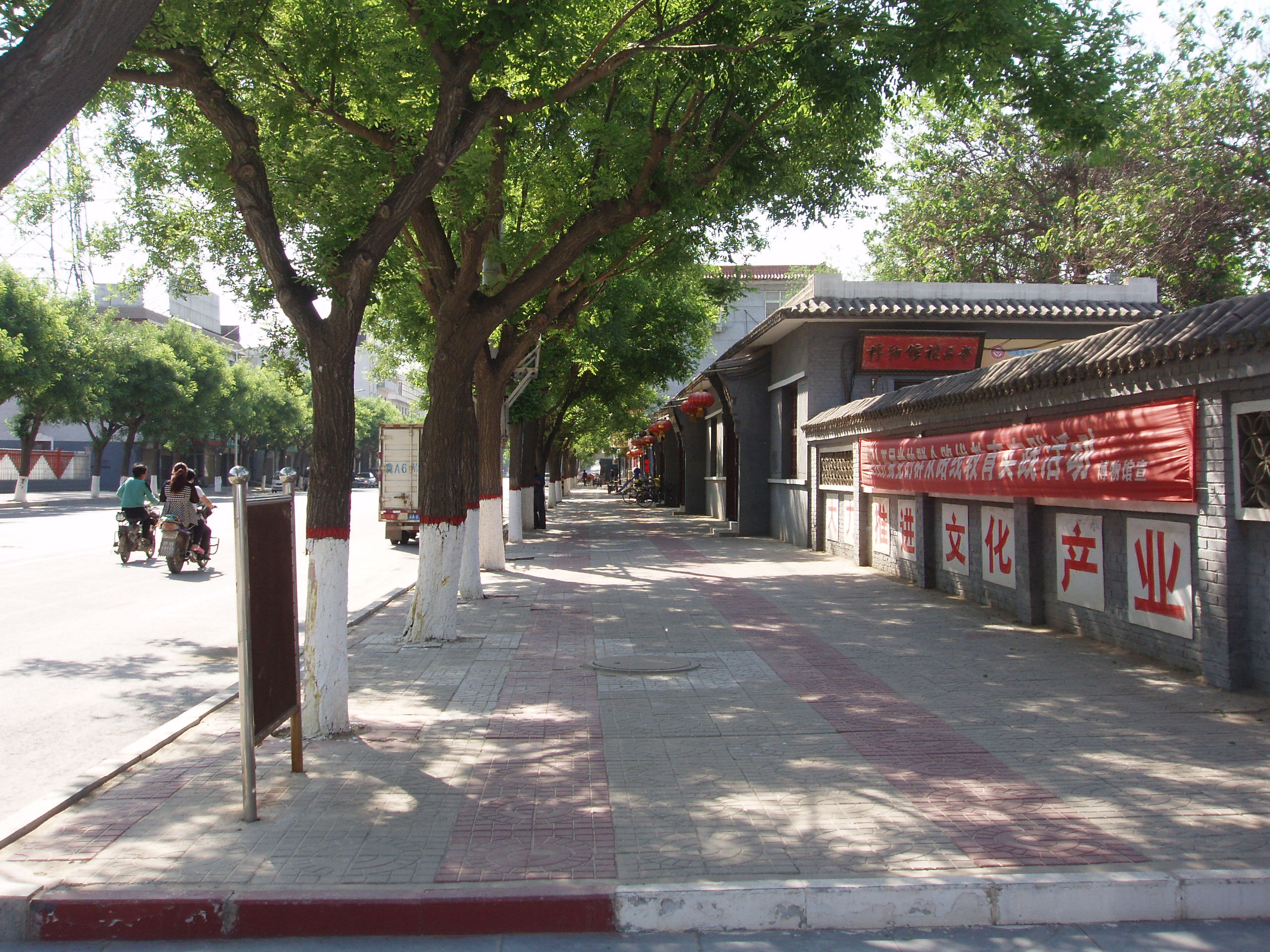

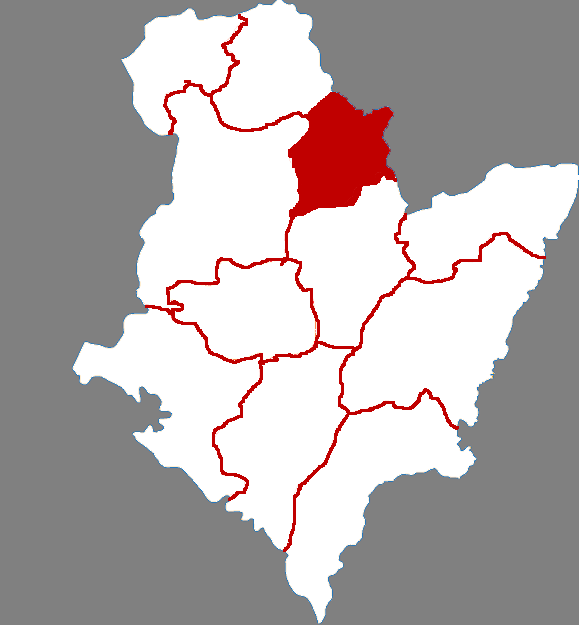
- Wuqiang in Hengshui

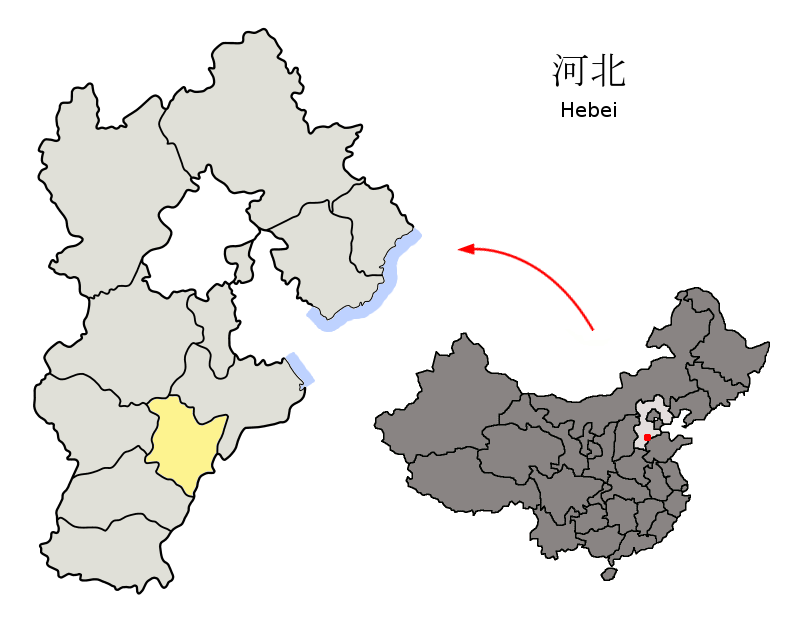
- Hengshui in Hebei
- Coordinates: 38°02′28″N 115°58′55″E
- Country: People's Republic of China
- Province: Hebei
- Prefecture-level city: Hengshui
- County seat: Wuqiang Town (武强镇)

Area
  - Total: 442 km^{2} (171 sq mi)
- Elevation: 18 m (59 ft)

Population
  - Total: 210,000
  - Density: 480/km^{2} (1,200/sq mi)
- Time zone: UTC+8 (China Standard)
- Postal code: 053300
- Area code: 0318
- Website: wuqiang.gov.cn

Wuqiang County (simplified Chinese: 武强县; traditional Chinese: 武強縣; pinyin: Wǔqiáng Xiàn) is a county in the southeast-central part of Hebei province, China. It is under the administration of the prefecture-level city of Hengshui, with a population of 210,000 residing in an area of 442 km^{2} (171 sq mi). Both China National Highway 307 and G1811 Huanghua–Shijiazhuang Expressway pass through the county.

The famous luthier Song Chung has his workshop in Wuqiang.

== Administrative divisions ==
The county administers 3 towns and 3 townships.

Towns:

- Wuqiang (武强镇), Jieguan (街关镇), Zhouwo (周窝镇)

Townships:

- Doucun Township (豆村乡), Beidai Township (北代乡), Sunzhuang Township (孙庄乡)

== Climate ==
Climate data for Wuqiang, elevation 16 m (52 ft), (1991–2020 normals, extremes 1981–2010)
Month	Jan	Feb	Mar	Apr	May	Jun	Jul	Aug	Sep	Oct	Nov	Dec	Year
Record high °C (°F)	16.6 (61.9)	23.3 (73.9)	30.8 (87.4)	34.3 (93.7)	41.7 (107.1)	41.2 (106.2)	41.9 (107.4)	38.8 (101.8)	36.6 (97.9)	31.8 (89.2)	25.7 (78.3)	18.2 (64.8)	41.9 (107.4)
Mean daily maximum °C (°F)	3.1 (37.6)	7.3 (45.1)	14.4 (57.9)	21.8 (71.2)	27.7 (81.9)	32.3 (90.1)	32.4 (90.3)	30.6 (87.1)	27.1 (80.8)	20.8 (69.4)	11.5 (52.7)	4.4 (39.9)	19.5 (67.0)
Daily mean °C (°F)	−3.4 (25.9)	0.5 (32.9)	7.4 (45.3)	14.8 (58.6)	20.9 (69.6)	25.7 (78.3)	27.2 (81.0)	25.4 (77.7)	20.6 (69.1)	13.8 (56.8)	5.2 (41.4)	−1.4 (29.5)	13.1 (55.5)
Mean daily minimum °C (°F)	−8.3 (17.1)	−4.7 (23.5)	1.4 (34.5)	8.4 (47.1)	14.3 (57.7)	19.6 (67.3)	22.7 (72.9)	21.2 (70.2)	15.4 (59.7)	8.2 (46.8)	0.3 (32.5)	−5.9 (21.4)	7.7 (45.9)
Record low °C (°F)	−20.7 (−5.3)	−17.2 (1.0)	−10.3 (13.5)	−3.6 (25.5)	3.4 (38.1)	8.2 (46.8)	15.9 (60.6)	11.8 (53.2)	5.5 (41.9)	−3.7 (25.3)	−17.5 (0.5)	−20.3 (−4.5)	−20.7 (−5.3)
Average precipitation mm (inches)	1.5 (0.06)	5.7 (0.22)	7.8 (0.31)	23.8 (0.94)	34.2 (1.35)	64.5 (2.54)	155.6 (6.13)	107.3 (4.22)	38.1 (1.50)	28.0 (1.10)	13.2 (0.52)	2.6 (0.10)	482.3 (18.99)
Average precipitation days (≥ 0.1 mm)	1.3	2.4	2.4	4.8	5.7	7.8	10.9	9.7	6.1	4.7	3.4	1.8	61
Average snowy days	2.2	2.8	0.8	0.2	0	0	0	0	0	0	1.1	2.3	9.4
Average relative humidity (%)	61	56	52	55	59	60	75	82	75	68	68	65	65
Mean monthly sunshine hours	165.8	174.1	228.5	248.6	278.7	247.9	215.4	210.6	207.9	195.7	162.2	156.2	2,491.6
Percentage possible sunshine	54	57	61	63	63	56	48	50	56	57	54	53	56
Source: China Meteorological Administration
