= Wuyi County, Hebei =

Wuyi County 武邑县
- County
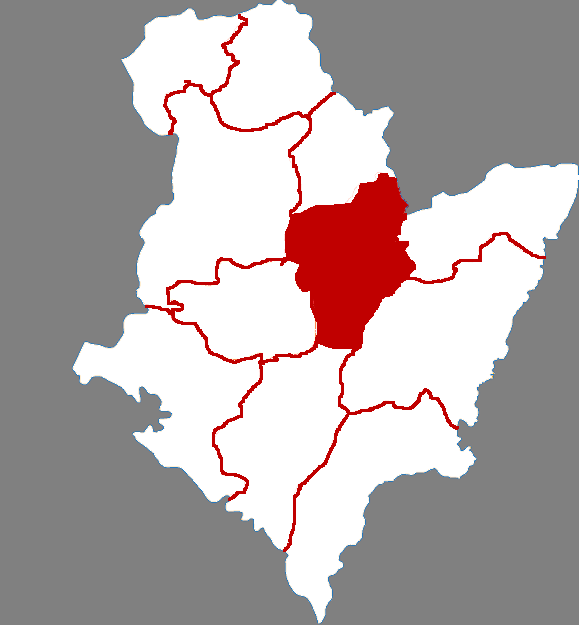
- Wuyi in Hengshui

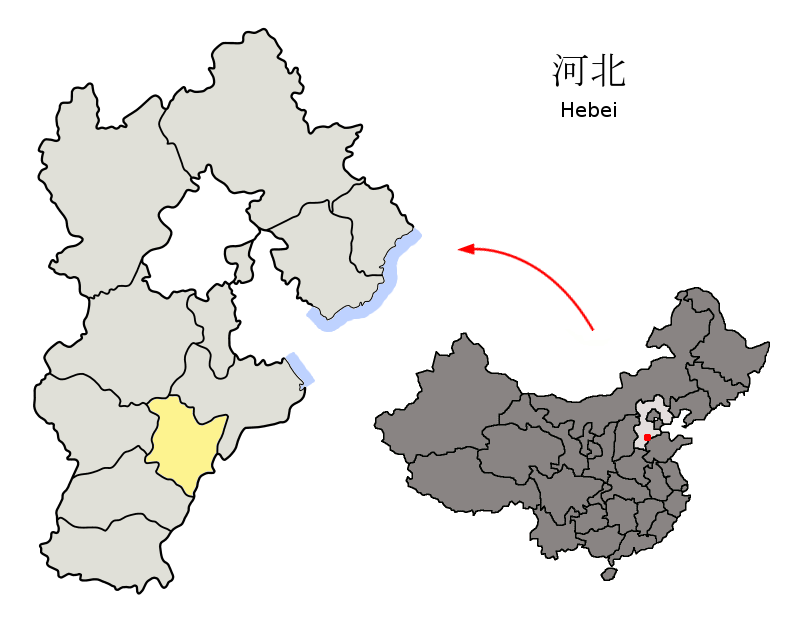
- Hengshui in Hebei
- Coordinates: 37°48′07″N 115°53′17″E
- Country: People's Republic of China
- Province: Hebei
- Prefecture-level city: Hengshui

Area
  - Total: 830 km^{2} (320 sq mi)
- Elevation: 21 m (69 ft)

Population (2004)
  - Total: 310,000
  - Density: 370/km^{2} (970/sq mi)
- Time zone: UTC+8 (China Standard)
- Postal code: 053400
- Area code: 0318
- Website: wuyi.gov.cn

Wuyi (Chinese: 武邑; pinyin: Wǔyì) is a county of southeastern Hebei province, China, served by China National Highway 106. It is under the administration of the prefecture-level city of Hengshui, and, as of 2004, had a population of 310,000 residing in an area of 830 km^{2} (320 sq mi).

== Administrative divisions ==
The county administers 6 towns and 3 townships.

Towns:

- Wuyi (武邑镇), Qingliangdian (清凉店镇), Shenpo (审坡镇), Zhaoqiao (赵桥镇), Hanzhuang (韩庄镇), Xiaoqiaotou (肖桥头镇)

Townships:

- Longdian Township (龙店乡), Quantou Township (圈头乡), Dazita Township (大紫塔乡)

== Climate ==
Climate data for Wuyi, elevation 21 m (69 ft), (1991–2020 normals, extremes 1981–2010)
Month	Jan	Feb	Mar	Apr	May	Jun	Jul	Aug	Sep	Oct	Nov	Dec	Year
Record high °C (°F)	16.5 (61.7)	22.7 (72.9)	31.4 (88.5)	34.0 (93.2)	40.8 (105.4)	40.6 (105.1)	42.2 (108.0)	38.2 (100.8)	36.7 (98.1)	32.1 (89.8)	26.3 (79.3)	18.4 (65.1)	42.2 (108.0)
Mean daily maximum °C (°F)	3.2 (37.8)	7.5 (45.5)	14.5 (58.1)	21.7 (71.1)	27.4 (81.3)	32.0 (89.6)	32.2 (90.0)	30.5 (86.9)	27.0 (80.6)	20.8 (69.4)	11.7 (53.1)	4.6 (40.3)	19.4 (67.0)
Daily mean °C (°F)	−2.6 (27.3)	1.2 (34.2)	7.9 (46.2)	15.0 (59.0)	21.1 (70.0)	25.9 (78.6)	27.3 (81.1)	25.7 (78.3)	21.0 (69.8)	14.3 (57.7)	5.8 (42.4)	−0.8 (30.6)	13.5 (56.3)
Mean daily minimum °C (°F)	−7.0 (19.4)	−3.6 (25.5)	2.4 (36.3)	9.0 (48.2)	15.0 (59.0)	20.2 (68.4)	23.0 (73.4)	21.7 (71.1)	16.3 (61.3)	9.2 (48.6)	1.3 (34.3)	−4.7 (23.5)	8.6 (47.4)
Record low °C (°F)	−20.2 (−4.4)	−16.8 (1.8)	−10.3 (13.5)	−1.8 (28.8)	3.8 (38.8)	9.0 (48.2)	15.0 (59.0)	13.4 (56.1)	6.3 (43.3)	−2.9 (26.8)	−18.1 (−0.6)	−22.5 (−8.5)	−22.5 (−8.5)
Average precipitation mm (inches)	1.6 (0.06)	6.1 (0.24)	6.7 (0.26)	25.9 (1.02)	35.4 (1.39)	60.7 (2.39)	142.2 (5.60)	110.2 (4.34)	40.6 (1.60)	26.9 (1.06)	13.8 (0.54)	2.7 (0.11)	472.8 (18.61)
Average precipitation days (≥ 0.1 mm)	1.6	2.5	2.2	4.8	5.7	8.1	11.0	9.3	6.0	4.7	3.6	1.9	61.4
Average snowy days	2.3	2.7	0.9	0.2	0	0	0	0	0	0	1.0	1.8	8.9
Average relative humidity (%)	59	55	51	56	59	60	75	80	73	66	66	64	64
Mean monthly sunshine hours	161.1	171.6	221.5	234.2	260.9	225.5	186.2	196.7	196.3	186.5	155.5	153.5	2,349.5
Percentage possible sunshine	53	56	59	59	59	51	42	47	53	54	52	52	53
Source: China Meteorological Administration
