= Raoyang County =

Raoyang County 饶阳县 Jaoyang
- County
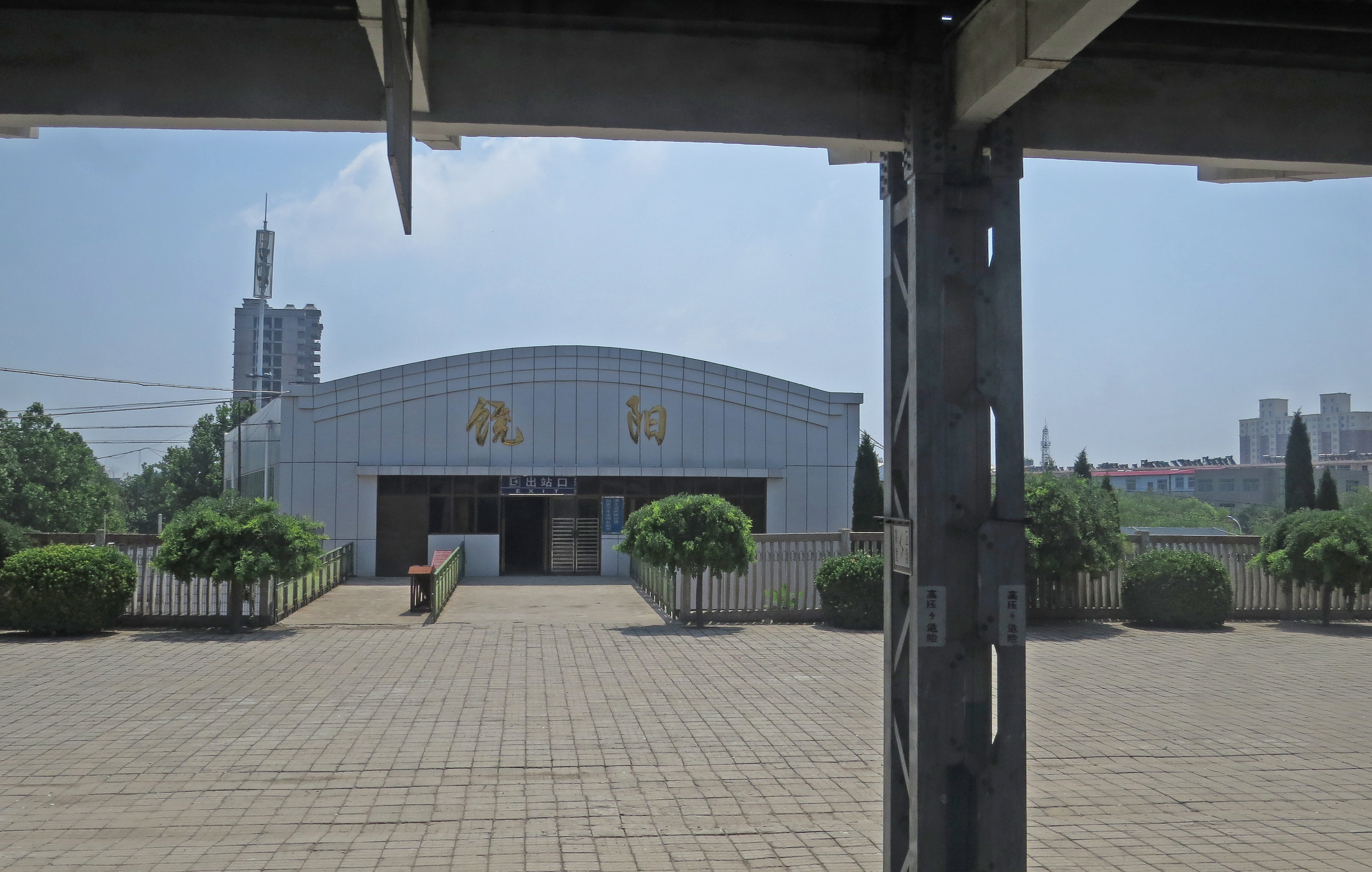
- Raoyang Railway Station

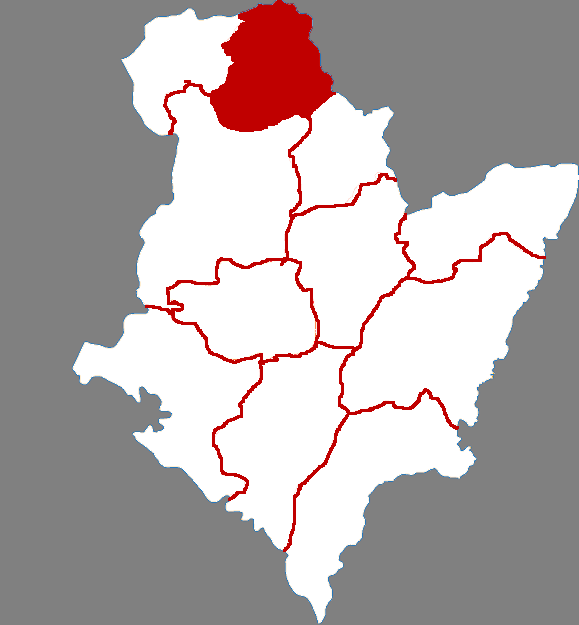
- Raoyang in Hengshui

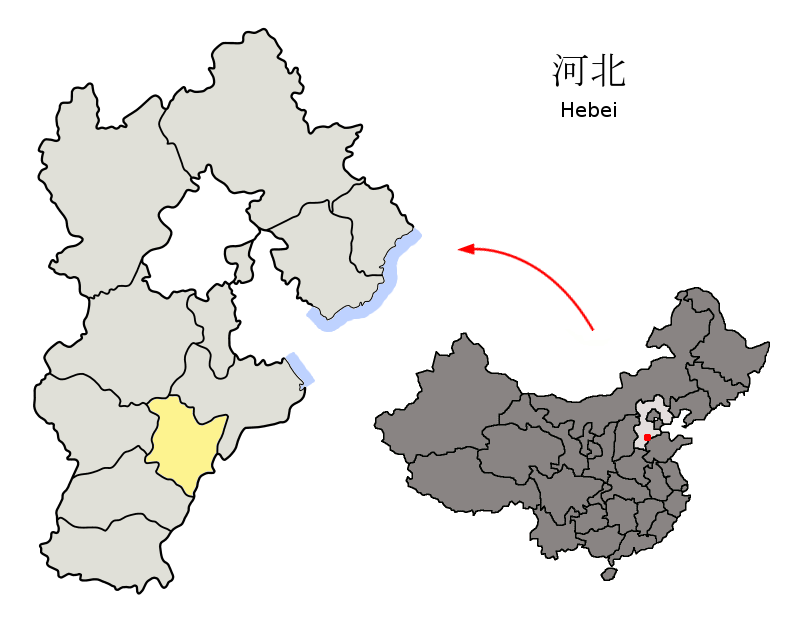
- Hengshui in Hebei
- Coordinates: 38°14′10″N 115°43′34″E
- Country: People's Republic of China
- Province: Hebei
- Prefecture-level city: Hengshui
- County seat: Raoyang Town (饶阳镇)

Area
  - Total: 573 km^{2} (221 sq mi)
- Elevation: 22 m (72 ft)

Population (2004)
  - Total: 290,000
  - Density: 510/km^{2} (1,300/sq mi)
- Time zone: UTC+8 (China Standard)
- Postal code: 053900
- Area code: 0318

Raoyang County (simplified Chinese: 饶阳县; traditional Chinese: 饒陽縣; pinyin: Ráoyáng Xiàn) is a county in the southeast of Hebei province, China, served by G45 Daqing–Guangzhou Expressway. It is under the administration of the prefecture-level city of Hengshui, and, as of 2004, has a population of 290,000 residing in an area of 573 km^{2} (221 sq mi).

== Administrative divisions ==
The county administers 4 towns and 3 townships.

Towns:

- Raoyang (饶阳镇), Dayincun (大尹村镇), Wusong (五公镇), Daguanting (大官亭镇)

Townships:

- Wangtongyue Township (王同岳乡), Liuchu Township (留楚乡), Dongliman Township (东里满乡)

== Climate ==
Climate data for Raoyang, elevation 18 m (59 ft), (1991–2020 normals, extremes 1981–2010)
Month	Jan	Feb	Mar	Apr	May	Jun	Jul	Aug	Sep	Oct	Nov	Dec	Year
Record high °C (°F)	16.3 (61.3)	23.4 (74.1)	30.7 (87.3)	34.0 (93.2)	40.6 (105.1)	40.5 (104.9)	42.1 (107.8)	38.6 (101.5)	35.6 (96.1)	31.1 (88.0)	25.1 (77.2)	19.1 (66.4)	42.1 (107.8)
Mean daily maximum °C (°F)	2.8 (37.0)	7.1 (44.8)	14.3 (57.7)	21.7 (71.1)	27.5 (81.5)	31.9 (89.4)	32.2 (90.0)	30.4 (86.7)	26.8 (80.2)	20.4 (68.7)	11.2 (52.2)	4.2 (39.6)	19.2 (66.6)
Daily mean °C (°F)	−3.4 (25.9)	0.5 (32.9)	7.5 (45.5)	14.9 (58.8)	20.9 (69.6)	25.5 (77.9)	27 (81)	25.4 (77.7)	20.5 (68.9)	13.5 (56.3)	5.0 (41.0)	−1.5 (29.3)	13.0 (55.4)
Mean daily minimum °C (°F)	−8.0 (17.6)	−4.4 (24.1)	1.8 (35.2)	8.9 (48.0)	14.7 (58.5)	19.8 (67.6)	22.7 (72.9)	21.4 (70.5)	15.7 (60.3)	8.4 (47.1)	0.4 (32.7)	−5.6 (21.9)	8.0 (46.4)
Record low °C (°F)	−19.0 (−2.2)	−17.5 (0.5)	−9.6 (14.7)	−1.4 (29.5)	4.7 (40.5)	10.4 (50.7)	16.1 (61.0)	12.8 (55.0)	4.8 (40.6)	−4.4 (24.1)	−17.0 (1.4)	−21.8 (−7.2)	−21.8 (−7.2)
Average precipitation mm (inches)	1.7 (0.07)	5.3 (0.21)	8.2 (0.32)	25.7 (1.01)	36.3 (1.43)	56.9 (2.24)	144.1 (5.67)	104.1 (4.10)	39.2 (1.54)	25.9 (1.02)	13.2 (0.52)	2.9 (0.11)	463.5 (18.24)
Average precipitation days (≥ 0.1 mm)	1.4	2.3	2.6	4.8	6.0	7.6	10.9	9.8	6.3	4.9	3.7	1.7	62
Average snowy days	2.7	2.7	1.0	0.2	0	0	0	0	0	0	1.4	2.7	10.7
Average relative humidity (%)	59	54	50	53	57	60	75	80	74	69	67	63	63
Mean monthly sunshine hours	176.7	176.6	231.7	249.3	272.9	238.7	198.8	196.5	206.5	202.0	168.7	167.7	2,486.1
Percentage possible sunshine	58	58	62	63	62	54	44	47	56	59	56	57	56
Source: China Meteorological Administration
