= Zaoqiang County =

Zaoqiang County 枣强县 Tsaokiang
- County
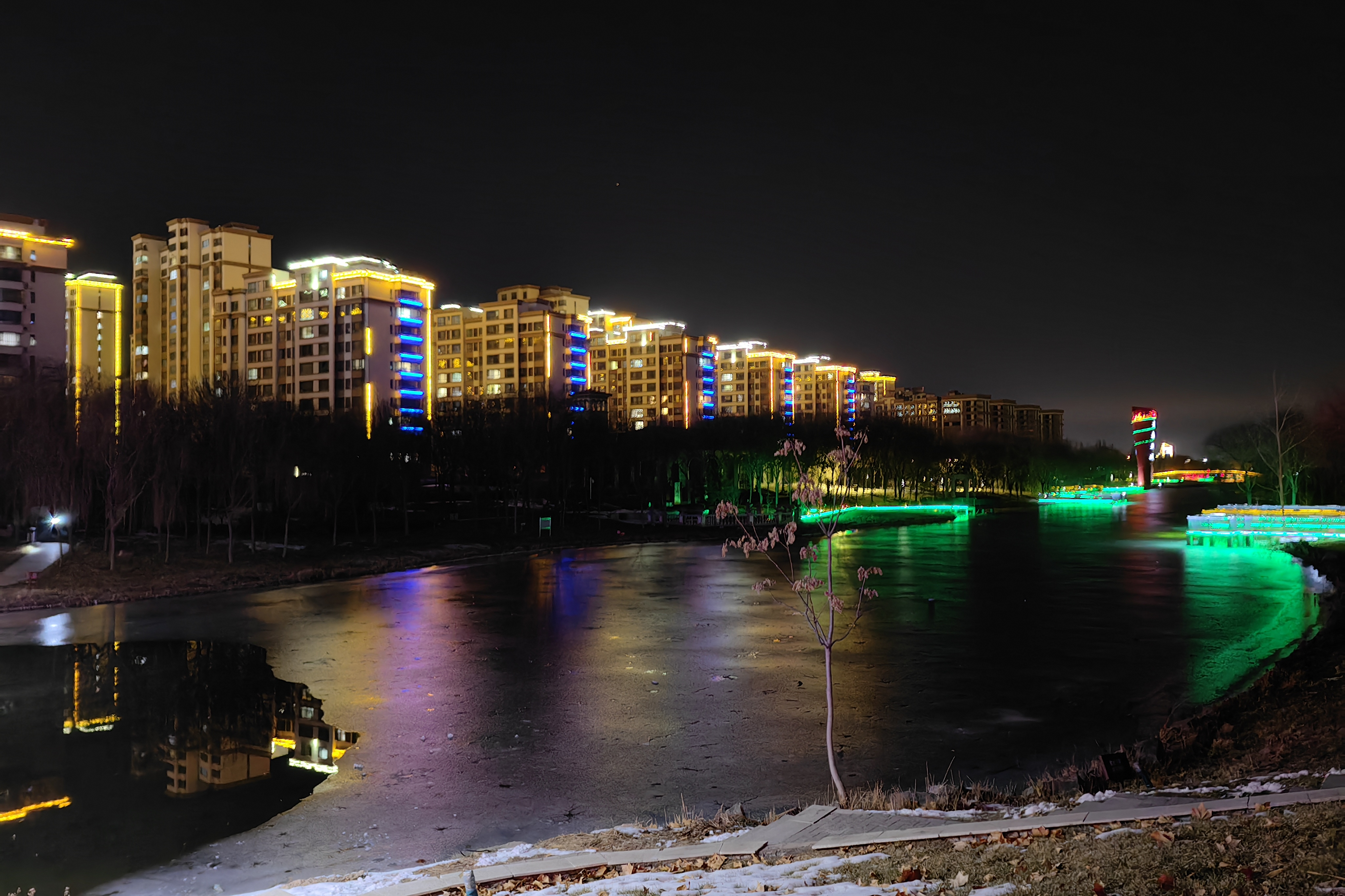

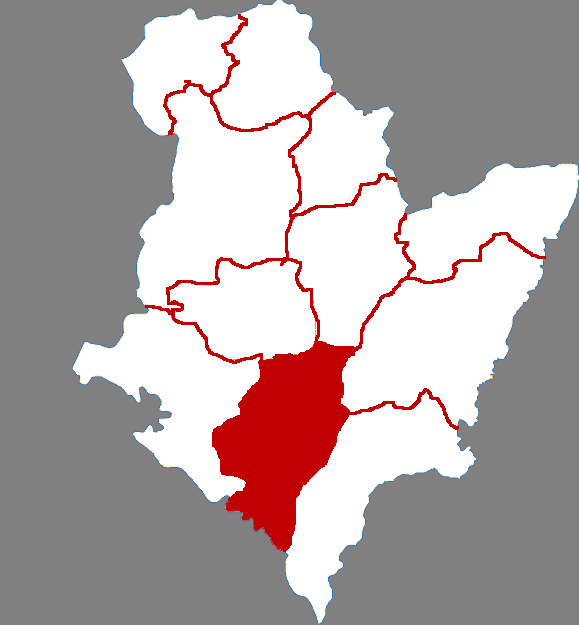
- Zaoqiang in Hengshui

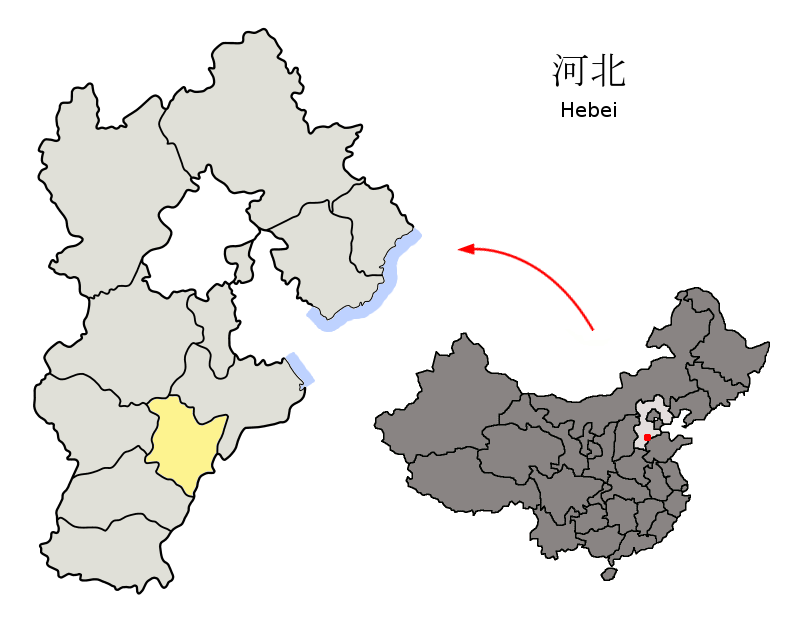
- Hengshui in Hebei
- Coordinates: 37°30′47″N 115°43′26″E
- Country: People's Republic of China
- Province: Hebei
- Prefecture-level city: Hengshui
- County seat: Zaoqiang Town (枣强镇)

Area
  - Total: 903 km^{2} (349 sq mi)
- Elevation: 27 m (89 ft)

Population (2004)
  - Total: 380,000
  - Density: 420/km^{2} (1,100/sq mi)
- Time zone: UTC+8 (China Standard)
- Postal code: 053100
- Area code: 0318

Zaoqiang County (simplified Chinese: 枣强县; traditional Chinese: 棗強縣; pinyin: Zǎoqiáng Xiàn) is a county in the southeast of Hebei province, China, served by G45 Daqing–Guangzhou Expressway. It is under the administration of the prefecture-level city of Hengshui, and, as of 2004, had a population of 380,000 residing in an area of 903 km^{2} (349 sq mi).

== Administrative divisions ==
The county administers 6 towns and 5 townships.

Towns:

- Zaoqiang (枣强镇), Encha (恩察镇), Daying (大营镇), Jiahui (嘉会镇), Matun (马屯镇), Xiaozhang (肖张镇)

Townships:

- Zhangxiutun Township (张秀屯乡), Xintun Township (新屯乡), Wangjun Township (王均乡), Tanglin Township (唐林乡), Wangchang Township (王常乡)

== Climate ==
Climate data for Zaoqiang, elevation 24 m (79 ft), (1991–2020 normals, extremes 1981–2010)
Month	Jan	Feb	Mar	Apr	May	Jun	Jul	Aug	Sep	Oct	Nov	Dec	Year
Record high °C (°F)	16.8 (62.2)	24.4 (75.9)	28.6 (83.5)	32.9 (91.2)	40.8 (105.4)	40.6 (105.1)	42.7 (108.9)	37.0 (98.6)	38.3 (100.9)	32.6 (90.7)	26.3 (79.3)	19.5 (67.1)	42.7 (108.9)
Mean daily maximum °C (°F)	3.5 (38.3)	7.7 (45.9)	14.8 (58.6)	21.8 (71.2)	27.7 (81.9)	32.5 (90.5)	32.4 (90.3)	30.7 (87.3)	27.3 (81.1)	21.2 (70.2)	12.0 (53.6)	5.0 (41.0)	19.7 (67.5)
Daily mean °C (°F)	−2.4 (27.7)	1.4 (34.5)	8.0 (46.4)	15.1 (59.2)	21.3 (70.3)	26.2 (79.2)	27.4 (81.3)	25.9 (78.6)	21.2 (70.2)	14.4 (57.9)	6.0 (42.8)	−0.5 (31.1)	13.7 (56.6)
Mean daily minimum °C (°F)	−6.7 (19.9)	−3.4 (25.9)	2.6 (36.7)	9.3 (48.7)	15.2 (59.4)	20.4 (68.7)	23.1 (73.6)	21.9 (71.4)	16.4 (61.5)	9.3 (48.7)	1.5 (34.7)	−4.5 (23.9)	8.8 (47.8)
Record low °C (°F)	−17.7 (0.1)	−15.4 (4.3)	−8.9 (16.0)	−0.8 (30.6)	4.8 (40.6)	10.3 (50.5)	17.2 (63.0)	14.6 (58.3)	6.5 (43.7)	−2.0 (28.4)	−13.8 (7.2)	−17.2 (1.0)	−17.7 (0.1)
Average precipitation mm (inches)	1.9 (0.07)	5.6 (0.22)	7.5 (0.30)	25.5 (1.00)	37.1 (1.46)	57.9 (2.28)	139.9 (5.51)	110.7 (4.36)	39.5 (1.56)	28.6 (1.13)	13.6 (0.54)	2.7 (0.11)	470.5 (18.54)
Average precipitation days (≥ 0.1 mm)	1.5	2.6	2.4	5.2	6.2	7.9	10.4	9.0	6.1	4.9	3.7	2.0	61.9
Average snowy days	2.2	2.9	0.8	0.2	0	0	0	0	0	0	1.0	1.8	8.9
Average relative humidity (%)	59	54	51	56	58	58	75	79	72	66	66	63	63
Mean monthly sunshine hours	160.5	168.2	220.8	231.4	267.1	234.6	204.9	214.3	203.7	197.1	162.5	160.8	2,425.9
Percentage possible sunshine	52	55	59	58	61	53	46	51	55	58	54	54	55
Source: China Meteorological Administration
