= Guangzhou No.2 High School =

High school in Guangzhou, China

Coordinates: 23.137683°N 113.260781°E

Guangzhou No.2 High School 廣州市第二中學

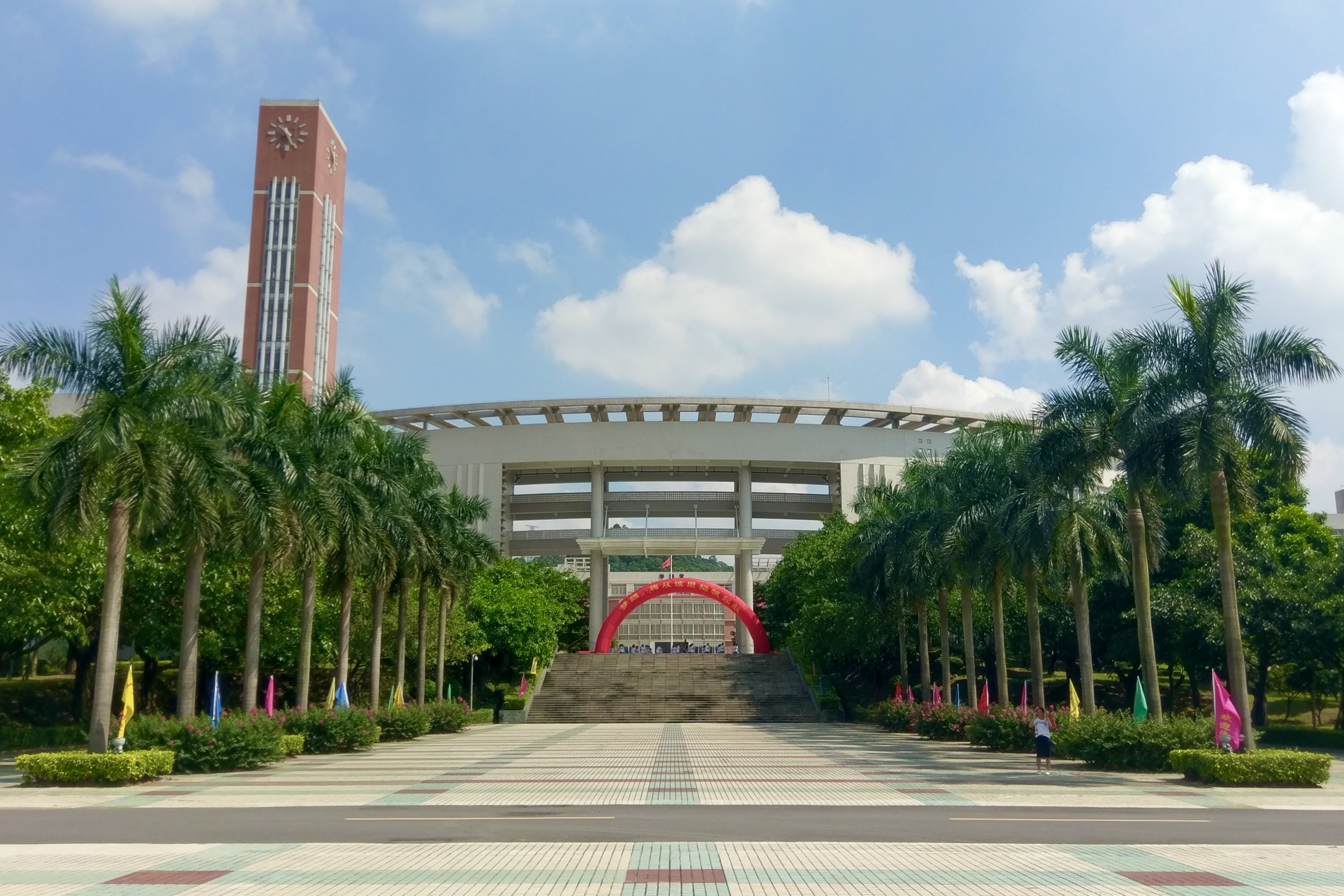
- Yingyuan Square at Science City Campus

Location
- 21 Yingyuan Road, Yuexiu District (Yingyuan Road Campus); 11 Shuixi Road, Huangpu District (Science City Campus); Guangzhou, Guangdong; China

Information
- Type: Public School; First Class Schools of Guangdong Province; National Demonstrative High School of Guangdong Province
- Motto: Dingtian Lidi (顶天立地)
- Established: August 1930; 96 years ago
- Principal: Zhang Xianlong (张先龙)
- Party Committee Secretary: Huang Xuesong (黄学松)
- Vice Principal: Zhang Mian, Wen Hui, Li Ying, Chen Jian (张绵、温辉、李颖、陈健)
- Employees: 372
- Grades: 7-9 (Yingyuan Road Campus); 9-12 (Science City Campus)
- Enrollment: 3,931 (2017)
- Area: Science City Campus: 33 hectares (82 acres)
- Color
- Website: http://www.gdgzez.com.cn

Guangzhou No.2 High School
- Simplified Chinese: 广州市第二中学
- Traditional Chinese: 廣州市第二中學
Transcriptions
Standard Mandarin
- Hanyu Pinyin: Guǎngzhōu Shì Dì'èr Zhōngxúe
Yue: Cantonese
- Yale Romanization: Gwóngjāu-síh Daih Yih Jūnghohk
- Jyutping: Gwong2zau1-si5 Dai6 Ji6 Zung1hok6

Short name
- Simplified Chinese: 广州二中
- Traditional Chinese: 廣州二中
Transcriptions
Standard Mandarin
- Hanyu Pinyin: Guǎngzhōu Èrzhōng
Yue: Cantonese
- Yale Romanization: Gwóngjāu Yih Jūng
- Jyutping: Gwong2zau1 Ji6 Zung1

Guangzhou No.2 High School (Chinese: 廣州市第二中學) is a Chinese public high school in Guangzhou, Guangdong. The school was established in August, 1930.

== History ==
=== Before establishment ===
In 1820, Ruan Yuan, Viceroy of Liangguang, established Xuehai Hall (Chinese: 学海堂; literally "Sea of studies") by borrowing Wenlan Academy in western Guangzhou (now Wenlan Lane, Xiajiu Road). In 1824, Ruan Yuan moved Xuehai Hall to a new school building at the foot of Yuexiu Hill. Under the efforts of Ruan Yuan, Xuehai Hall became the cultural and academic center of guangdong at that time. Since its establishment, Xuehai Hall has cultivated many talents at that time. In 1903, the hall was abolished and replaced by Ruan Taifu Temple to commemorate Ruan Yuan. The temple was abolished in 1911.

In 1867, Jiang Yili, the grand coordinator and provincial governor of guangdong, and Fang Junyi advocated the establishment of Jupo School (Chinese: 菊坡精舍), and hired Chen Feng as a senior. Jupo School cultivated many talents at that time, whose students had a certain influence on the local culture of Guangdong. In 1903, the school was closed and replaced by Chen's Temple.

In 1869, Wang Kaitai, Governor of Guangdong, founded Yingyuan Academy (Chinese: 应元书院) before Yingyuan Palace, which was designated for Juren, and became the highest institution of Guangzhou. After the fall of imperial examinations, the academy was no longer popular. In 1903, the academy was closed.

In 1906, the Qing government announced the formal abolition of the imperial examination system, and the academy originally set up for the imperial examination lost its value. In 1908, Zhang Renjun, grand coordinator and provincial governor of guangdong, founded the Guangdong Ancient Academy (Chinese: 广东存古学堂), which aimed to preserve the quintessence of Chinese culture, on the former sites of Yingyuan Academy and Jupo School.

After Xinhai Revolution, in 1921, Zhixin High School was built in the old site of Xuehai Hall but later moved to its current campus in 1923. In 1929, Guangzhou No.1 High School moved here.

=== After establishment ===
"Guangzhou No.2 Middle School" was formally established in August 1930. The first principal was Xu Gantang (Chinese: 徐甘棠), a well-known educator. It first rented the chapel and private houses in Xiguan as temporary buildings until 1932, moved to a new campus in Penglai Road (now Guangzhou No.1 High School, Chinese: 广州市第一中学). In 1938, after the Canton Operation, the school was suspended.

In September 1947, No.2 middle school reopened on the site of No.1 middle school in Yingyuan Road, with legislator Wang Hsiao-ying (Chinese: 王孝英) as the principal. In November 1949, CPC military representative Lai Yihui took over the school. In 1956, it was rated as the key middle school of Guangzhou. In the early 1960s, the school was designated as the experimental school for education reform with a five-year system for middle schools.

In January 1967, after the outbreak of the cultural revolution, mass organizations seized power and the school work was completely paralyzed. In the winter of 1969, a rural branch school was established on the barren hillside of Baishui Village in Shiling, Hua County (currently Huadu District). In the winter of 1974, the branch moved to Chen Dong reservoir. In March 1978, the revolutionary committee of the school was abolished. In August of the same year, the branch school was cancelled.

In 1994, the school was awarded as the first class schools of Guangdong. In 2007, it passed the acceptance of National Demonstrative High School of Guangdong.

In 2012, the school's English name was changed from Guangzhou No.2 Middle School to Guangzhou No.2 High School.

== Campuses ==
The school has 2 campuses.

=== Yingyuan Road Campus ===
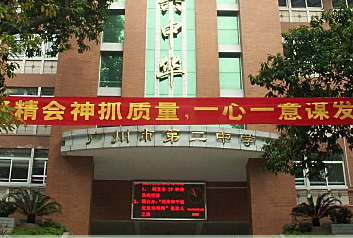
Yingyuan Campus

Yingyuan Road Campus (Chinese: 应元路校区) was built in 1930 on the south slope of Yuexiu Hill, Yuexiu District and used to be the site of Xuehai Hall. The campus now is the main campus of the school and used to serve students from grade 7 to 9.

=== Science City Campus ===
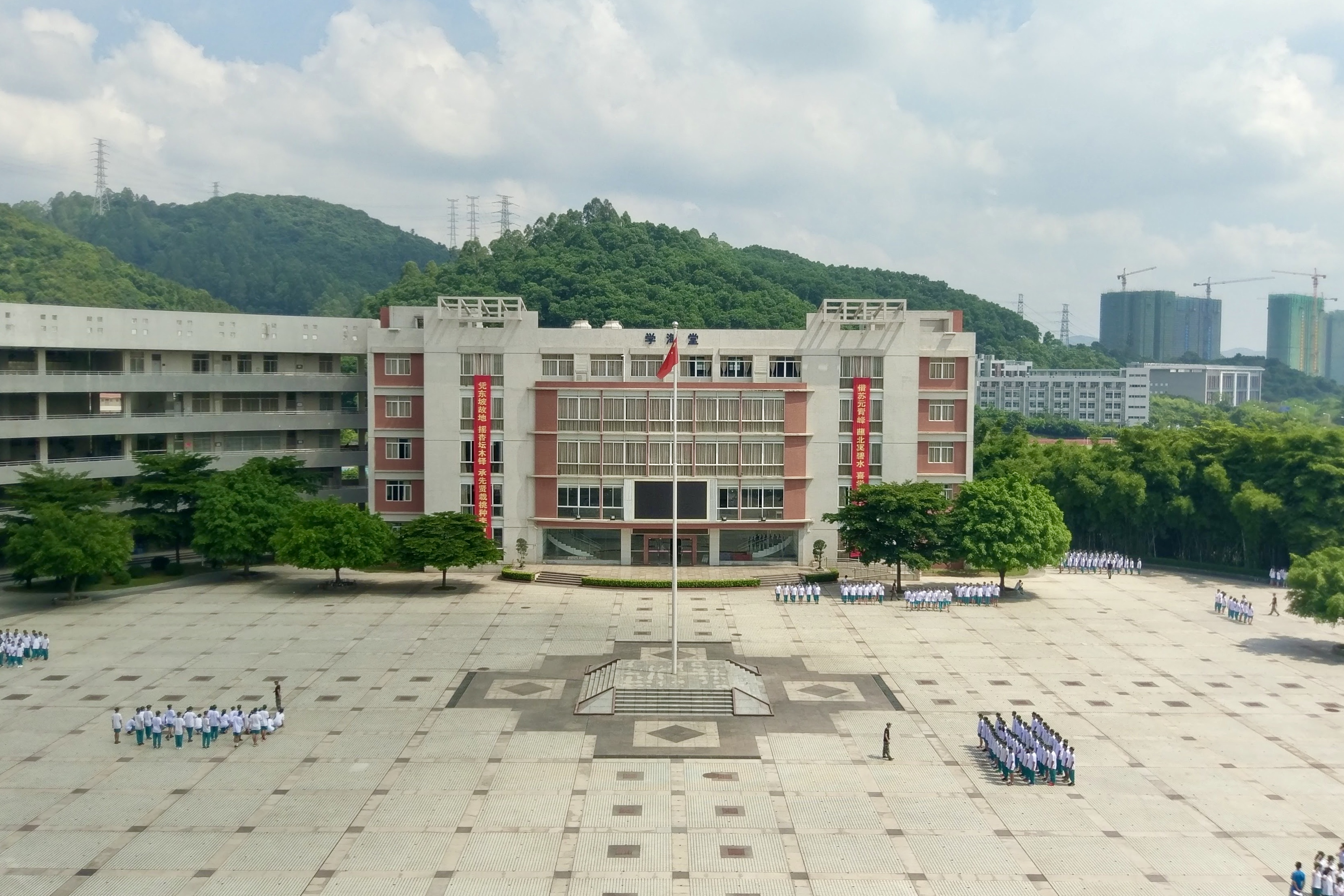
Central Square of Science City Campus

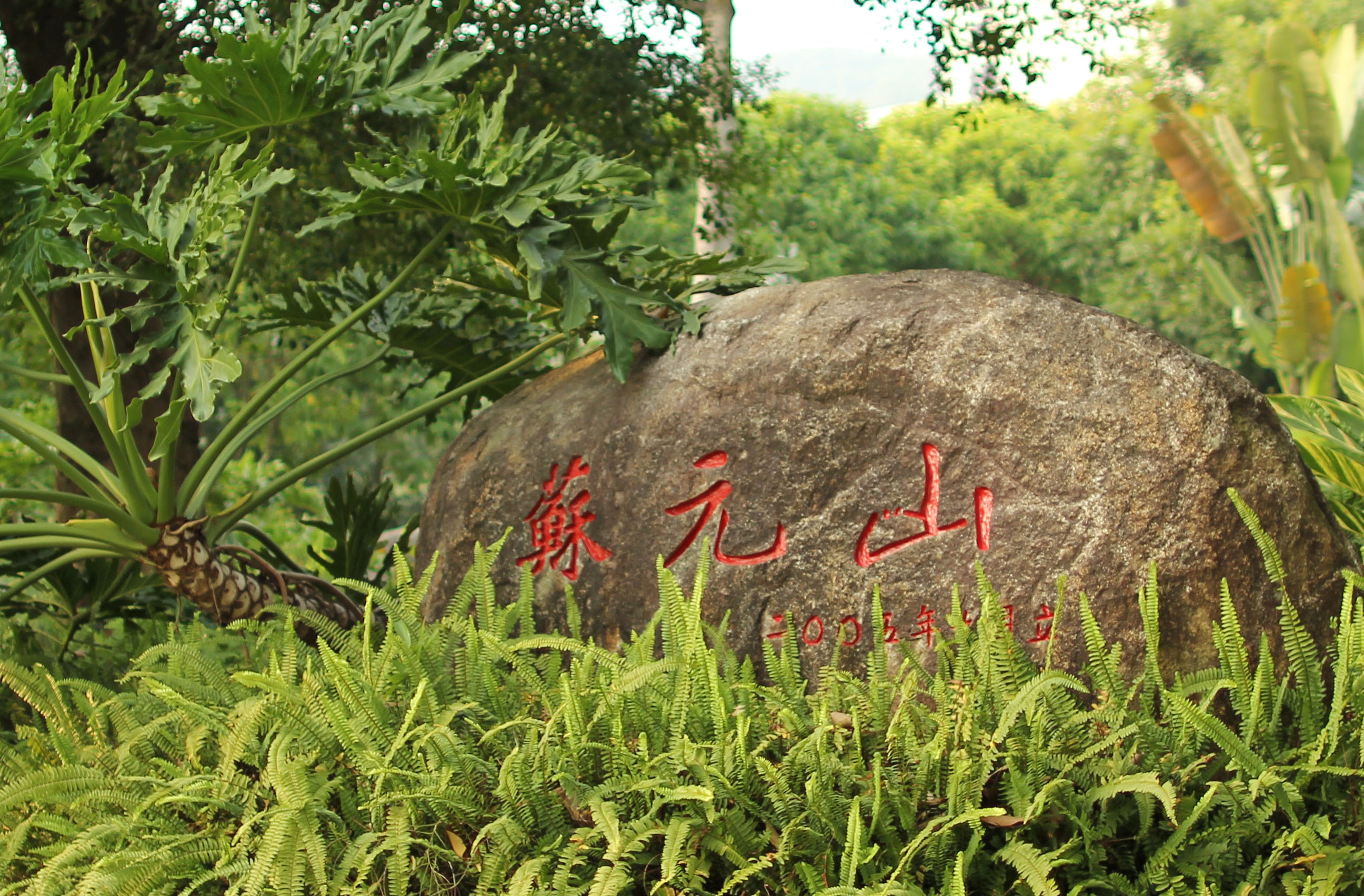
Suyuan Hill

Science City Campus (Chinese: 科学城校区) was built in 2005 on Suyuan Hill in Guangzhou Science City, Huangpu District. It is renowned in Guangzhou for its environment and high-quality education. This is an accommodation campus and serves high school students from grade 10 to 12.

== Education ==
Guangzhou No.2 High School is ranked top five among high schools in Guangzhou, Guangdong, both officially and unofficially.

== Campus culture ==
=== Motto ===
The school's motto is "Dingtian Lidi" ("顶天立地", lit. standing with his head in the clouds and feet on the earth), which was first introduced in 1940s by principal Wang Hsiao-ying, and relaunched in 2019.

=== "Yi-Zhong-Ren" ===
The concept of "Yi-Zhong-Ren" (Chinese: 義忠仁; pinyin: Yìzhōngrén; Jyutping: Ji6zung1jan4) debuted in 2010, on the 80th anniversary of the school, while "Yi-Zhong-Ren" has a similar pronunciation with "Peoples of No.2 School" (Chinese: 二中人; Jyutping: Ji6zung1jan4) in Cantonese. A series of T-shirts and hoodies of "Yi-Zhong-Ren" were designed by alumni, which has achieved its prevalence both inside and outside of the school campuses. In March 2018, "Yi-Zhong-Ren" obtained a trademark registration license.

== Extracurricular activities ==
=== Music Creator Concert ===
The Music Creator Concert (Chinese: 广州二中创作人音乐会) activity held by the students' union and the Art Department in every November is unique, while competitors are required to perform an original song or a song whose lyric or melody was rewritten by the competitors. Until the end of 2018, the concert has been held for 28 sessions. In 2015, the concert was awarded the first prize of "Brand activities of Schools in Guangzhou" (Chinese: 粤美校园品牌活动).

=== Lantern Festival Charity Sale ===
The charity sale (Chinese: 元宵花市爱心义卖) held in Lantern Festival every year since 1997. It was organized by student union, and parts of the profit from sales and auction would be used for charity. There are also entertainment and firework shows during the sale.

== Education Group ==
The Guangzhou No. 2 High School Education Group (Chinese: 广州二中教育集团) was founded in Dec 2017. Besides the school itself, the education group has founded 2 private schools and hosted 4 public schools. In 2019, the whole group has 7,066 students and 166 classes.

=== Private schools ===
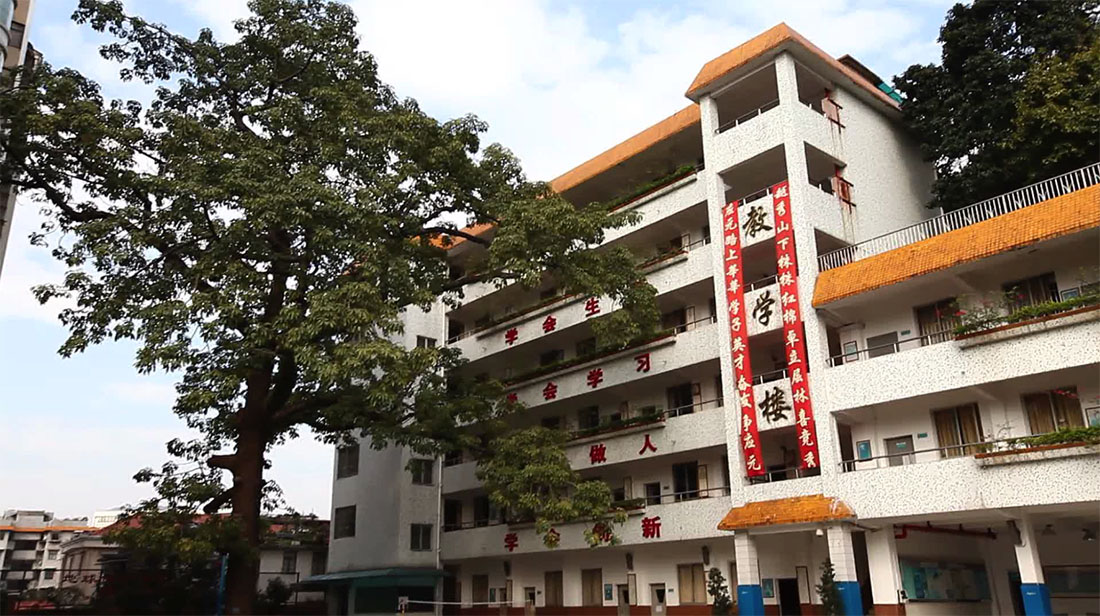
Yingyuan School

The two private schools have been assessed for good performances, but in recent years, it has been disputed and even punished for illegal enrollment.

- Yingyuan School (Chinese: 广州市越秀区二中应元学校, grade 7 to 9): This school was opened in 2002, which replaced a 70-year-old public primary school. The campus is relatively small; however, the education provided is also renowned in downtown Guangzhou.
- Suyuan Experimental School (Chinese: 广州市二中苏元实验学校, grade 7 to 9): This is a boarding school which located near Science City Campus and opened in 2011.

=== Public schools ===
The education group are hosting these public schools:

- Huangpu Huiyuan School (Chinese: 广州市黄埔区会元学校, grade 1 to 9): This school was opened in September 2016 and mainly serving children in nearby communities. As of 2019, only the primary school in use, and the middle school will be enabled in 2020.
- Huangpu Kaiyuan School (Chinese: 广州市黄埔区开元学校, grade 1 to 12): This school was opened in September 2018 and mainly serving children in nearby communities. As in 2019, only the primary school and middle school is in use.
- Zengcheng Yingyuan School (Chinese: 广州市增城区应元学校, grade 7 to 9): This school was opened in September 2018 to serve children in Zengcheng District.
- Nansha Tianyuan School (Chinese: 广州市第二中学南沙天元学校, grade 7 to 12): This school was opened in September 2019 to serve children in Nansha District. As of 2019, the school is under construction, and students have to take classes in a nearby primary school.

== Controversy ==
=== Dispute of cellphone ban ===
In early 2010s, the school issued a policy called "no IC" that no electronic products in teaching areas ("I" for electronic devices like iPhone, iPad etc.; "C" for computer). But in the late 2017, the executives of grade 10 issued a joint policy that the use of cellphones would no longer be allowed in the school including resting areas. The ban was fiercely opposed by grade 10 students, as the allowance of cellphones was a long-held policy of the school that demonstrated the freedom and humanity valued by prior principals and executive teams. In fact, many classes required in-class use of cellphones to finish assignments, and many students used their smartphones to study efficiently in their spare time. The policy was also criticized for unequal and biased treatment of students of grade 10 because students from grade 11 and 12 were not subject to the ban and could continue to use their phones. Under pressure from students and parents, executives held an unofficial conference at the end of the semester to revoke the ban.

== Links ==
- Official website
- Guangzhou No.2 High School on Weibo (in Chinese)
