= Fucheng County =

Fucheng County 阜城县 Fowcheng
- County
- Location in Hebei
- Coordinates: 37°52′N 116°09′E
- Country: People's Republic of China
- Province: Hebei
- Prefecture: Hengshui
- Time zone: UTC+8 (China Standard)
- Postal code: 053300

Fucheng County (simplified Chinese: 阜城县; traditional Chinese: 阜城縣; pinyin: Fùchéng Xiàn) is a county in Hengshui, Hebei province, China.

== Administrative Divisions ==
Towns:

- Fucheng (阜城镇), Gucheng (古城镇), Matou (码头镇), Xiakou (霞口镇), Cuijiamiao (崔家庙镇)

Townships:

- Manhe Township (漫河乡), Jianqiao Township (建桥乡), Jiangfang Township (蒋坊乡), Dabai Township (大白乡), Wangji Township (王集乡)

== Climate ==
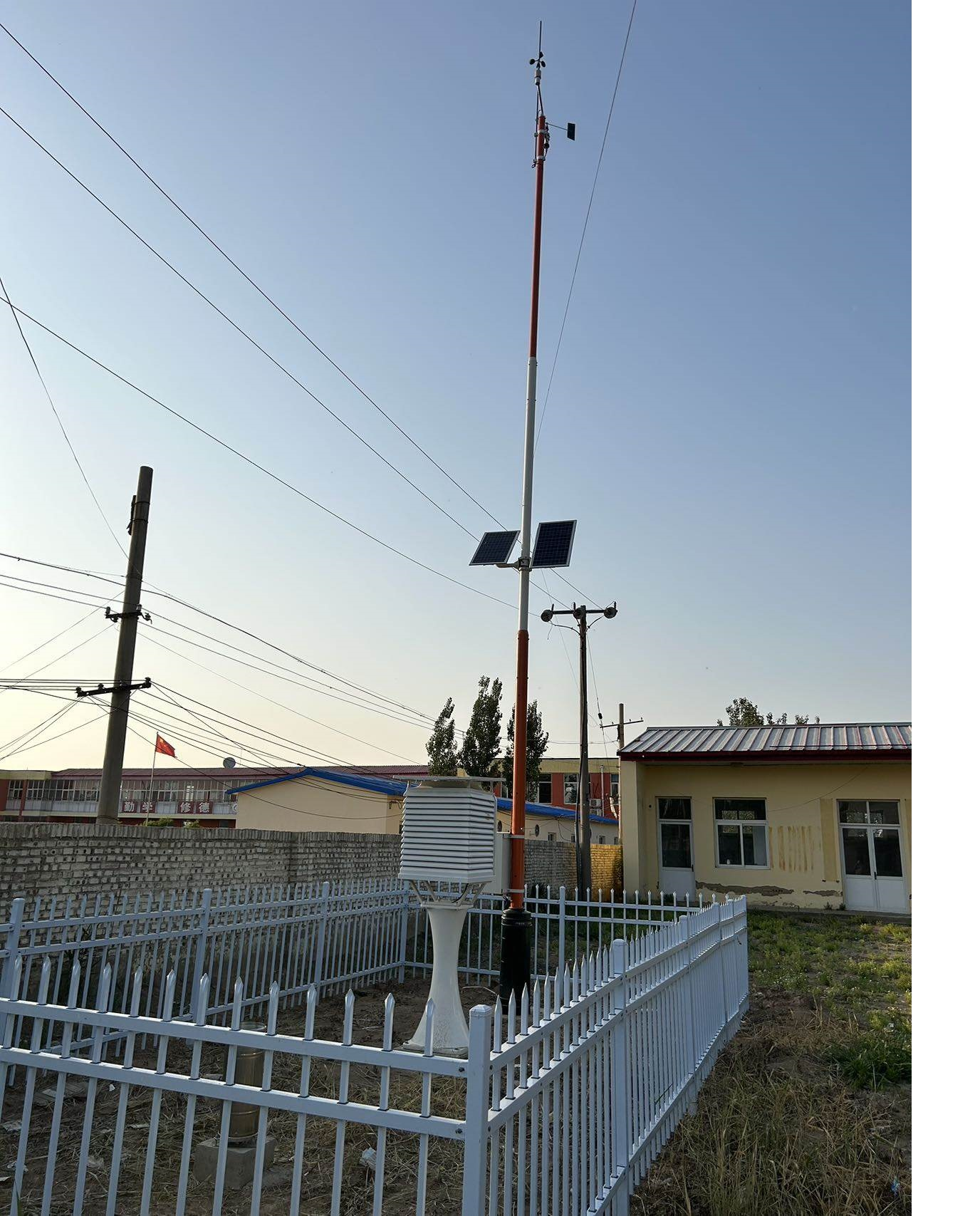
A meteorological station in a Stevenson screen in Fucheng county, China

Fucheng has a cold semi-arid climate (BSk), closely bordering a humid continental climate (Dwa), featuring very cold, dry winters influenced by the Siberian anticyclone and hot, wet summers due to the effects of the East Asian Monsoon.

Climate data for Fucheng, elevation 19 m (62 ft), (1991–2020 normals, extremes 1981–2010)
Month	Jan	Feb	Mar	Apr	May	Jun	Jul	Aug	Sep	Oct	Nov	Dec	Year
Record high °C (°F)	16.4 (61.5)	22.5 (72.5)	31.1 (88.0)	33.8 (92.8)	41.0 (105.8)	41.3 (106.3)	42.2 (108.0)	37.9 (100.2)	36.6 (97.9)	32.1 (89.8)	26.1 (79.0)	18.1 (64.6)	42.2 (108.0)
Mean daily maximum °C (°F)	3.3 (37.9)	7.5 (45.5)	14.5 (58.1)	21.8 (71.2)	27.7 (81.9)	32.3 (90.1)	32.5 (90.5)	30.8 (87.4)	27.3 (81.1)	21.0 (69.8)	11.8 (53.2)	4.7 (40.5)	19.6 (67.3)
Daily mean °C (°F)	−2.4 (27.7)	1.3 (34.3)	8.0 (46.4)	15.1 (59.2)	21.3 (70.3)	26.1 (79.0)	27.5 (81.5)	25.9 (78.6)	21.4 (70.5)	14.6 (58.3)	6.0 (42.8)	−0.6 (30.9)	13.7 (56.6)
Mean daily minimum °C (°F)	−6.7 (19.9)	−3.3 (26.1)	2.6 (36.7)	9.4 (48.9)	15.4 (59.7)	20.5 (68.9)	23.2 (73.8)	21.9 (71.4)	16.6 (61.9)	9.6 (49.3)	1.7 (35.1)	−4.4 (24.1)	8.9 (48.0)
Record low °C (°F)	−20.7 (−5.3)	−16.2 (2.8)	−10.2 (13.6)	−1.8 (28.8)	4.8 (40.6)	10.2 (50.4)	16.1 (61.0)	13.2 (55.8)	5.0 (41.0)	−3.6 (25.5)	−15.0 (5.0)	−22.5 (−8.5)	−22.5 (−8.5)
Average precipitation mm (inches)	1.9 (0.07)	6.7 (0.26)	8.0 (0.31)	25.9 (1.02)	35.9 (1.41)	72.0 (2.83)	161.3 (6.35)	117.2 (4.61)	36.8 (1.45)	29.3 (1.15)	13.9 (0.55)	3.0 (0.12)	511.9 (20.13)
Average precipitation days (≥ 0.1 mm)	1.6	2.7	2.3	5.3	6.1	7.9	10.9	9.7	5.7	4.9	3.9	2.3	63.3
Average snowy days	3.1	2.9	1.2	0.2	0	0	0	0	0	0	1.2	2.5	11.1
Average relative humidity (%)	58	54	50	53	56	59	74	78	70	64	65	62	62
Mean monthly sunshine hours	163.2	169.3	223.0	245.9	272.0	241.4	207.2	200.4	197.6	186.8	155.5	154.5	2,416.8
Percentage possible sunshine	53	55	60	62	62	55	46	48	54	55	52	52	55
Source: China Meteorological Administration
