= Loudi No. 2 High School =

- 娄底二中
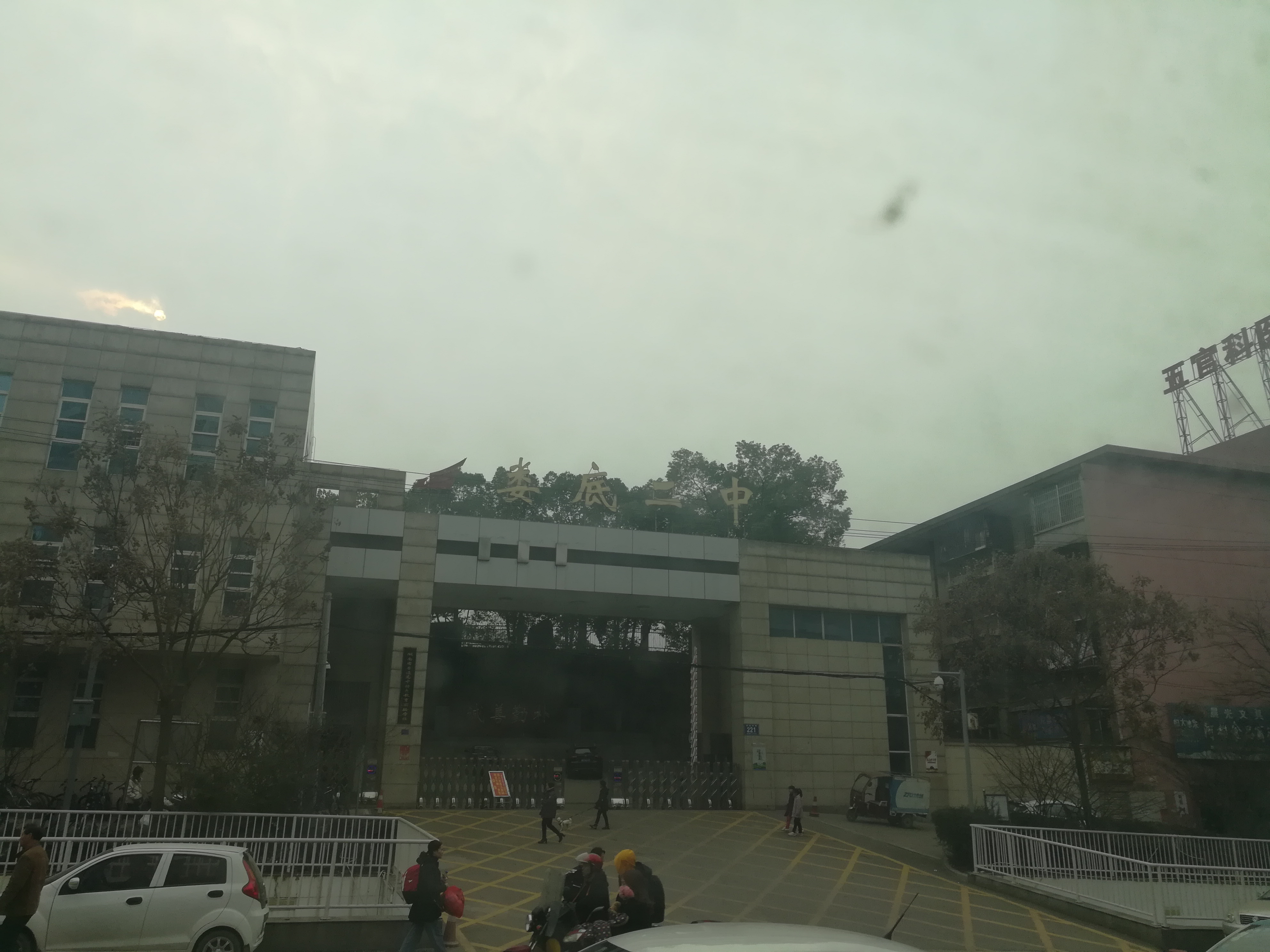
- Entrance of Loudi No. 2 High School.

Location
- Louxing District, Loudi, Hunan, China
- Coordinates: 27°44′34″N 112°00′13″E

Information
- Former name: Middle School of Loudi Town; Lianyuan No. 10 High School
- Type: Comprehensive Public High School
- Motto: (诚、善、勤、朴) (Honesty, kindness, diligence and simplicity)
- Established: 1959
- Principal: Chen Huaiyu (陈槐钰)
- Grades: 10 to 12
- Gender: Coed
- Enrollment: 6,000
- Classes: 77
- Campus size: 73,390 square metres (790,000 sq ft)
- Campus type: Urban
- Affiliation: Loudi Municipal Bureau of Education

Loudi No. 2 High School (simplified Chinese: 娄底市第二完全中学; traditional Chinese: 婁底市第二完全中學; pinyin: Lóudǐ Èrzhōng), commonly abbreviated as (Loudi) Erzhong (simplified Chinese: 娄底二中; traditional Chinese: 婁底二中), is a public coeducational high school in Louxing District of Loudi, Hunan, China.

== History ==
The school traces its origins to the former Middle School of Loudi Town (娄底镇初级中学), founded in 1959 and would later become the Lianyuan No. 10 High School (涟源十中). The school moved to its present 73,390-square-metre (790,000 sq ft) campus on Louxing South Road in Louxing District in 1979 and renamed "Loudi No. 2 High School".

== Athletics ==
- Wrestling. In 2001, Yan Zhihui (颜智慧), a student from the school, won a gold medal at the World Youth Wrestling Championship in Australia.
- Track and field. In 1993, Shao Guangying (邵光英), a student from the school, achieved 2 silver and 1 bronze medals at the World Track and Field Games for Middle School Students in Italy.
