= Ma'anshan No.2 High School =

School in Ma'anshan, China

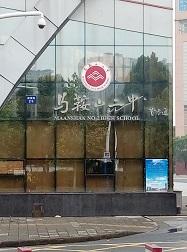
The logo of Ma'anshan No. 2 High School, the name in Chinese "马鞍山二中" is written by Fei Xiaotong.

Ma'anshan No.2 High School (Chinese: 马鞍山二中; pinyin: ma3 an1 shan1 er4 zhong1) is an institution of secondary education in Ma'anshan, Anhui Province of the People's Republic of China.

== History ==
Ma'anshan No.2 High School is founded in 1957, has a long history and a widespread fame between civilians of Ma'anshan .

== See also ==
Ma'anshan
