= Changzhou No. 2 High School =

High school in Changzhou, Jiangsu, China

Location
- Jiangsu Province; Changzhou

Information
- Enrollment: c. 2,000

Changzhou No. 2 High School is one of the four-star high schools in Jiangsu Province. Located in the center of Changzhou, which is an economically developed and cultured city, the high school has existed for more than 1250 years from the Song dynasty. Its predecessor is Changzhou Fuxue, established in the Tang dynasty of Tang Suzong.

== History ==
Many famous people came from Changzhou Fuxue (常州府学), such as Tang jingchuan, Sun shenxing, Zhuang cunyu, Zhao yi and Hong liangji. In October, 1924, people studying abroad returned to Changzhou and set up the Changzhou Private senior school on the site of the former address of Changzhou Fuxue, which opened the grand industry. In 1925, the school was renamed "Changzhou No. 2 High School" by the local government. In 1997, the school was designated a key high school of Jiangsu. In 2005, it became the four-star high school of Jiangsu Province.

== The school style ==
Influenced by the doctrine of Confucius and Mencius (the basic doctrine in China), it has become a place endowed with fine values, from which students cultivate good character.

Changzhou No. 2 High School uses advanced and scientific educational methods, in order to advance Confucian culture. It nurtured many eminent figures like Zhu Muzhi (Chinese Communist news activist), Wu Ze (a famous historian), Yu Yunjie (a famous painter), and Yuan Ying (a famous writer), creating improved education in regions south of the Yangtze River (one of the famous mother rivers in Jiangsu Province).

The school is well known for its highly quality education. In 1996, the school became the Province key high school. In 2005, it became one of the four-star high schools in Jiangsu. The school always keeps good enrollment quotas, which can ranks the first-class line. At present, the school has about 39 classes and more than 2000 students. After renovation, it has become one of the most beautiful schools in Changzhou. The Da cheng Door, Ming lun Hall and some major buildings make the school more elegant and simple. Ancient monument corridor, Rong ci Pavilion and Jin xian Lane exemplify traditional history and culture. The humane traditional culture and modern civilization are combined harmoniously.

== School motto ==
The school Motto is 'Cheng Su', which means honesty, sincere, good faith, serious attitudes towards learning.

- The school spirit is 'unite, be industrious, be practical and innovate'.
- The teaching style is 'love students, good guidance, conscientiousness and studiousness.
- The style of study is 'determination, civilization, enjoy study and conform to discipline'.
