= Taocheng, Hengshui =

Taocheng 桃城区
- District
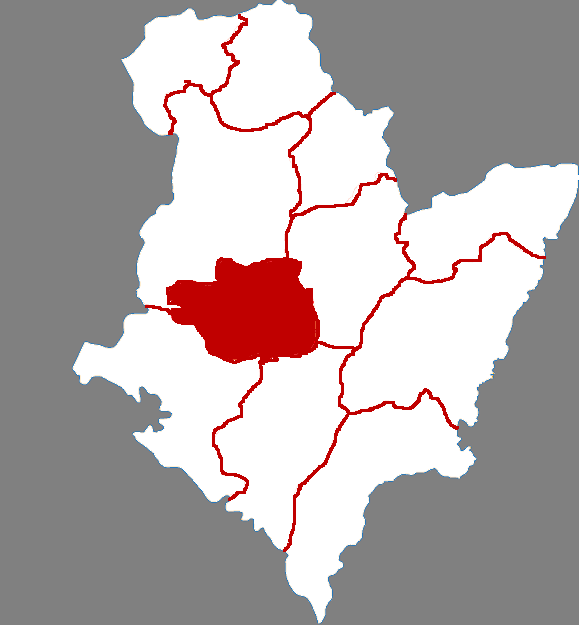
- Taocheng in Hengshui

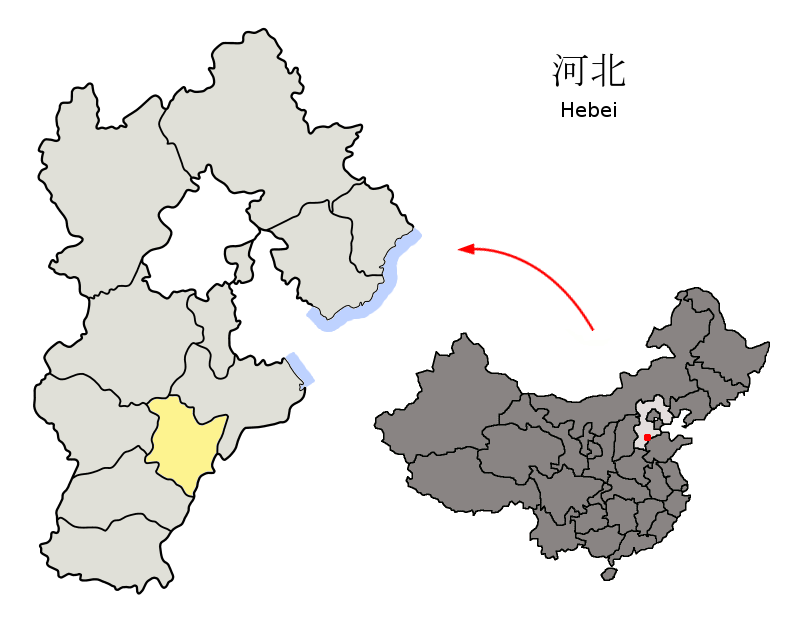
- Hengshui in Hebei
- Coordinates: 37°44′06″N 115°40′31″E
- Country: China
- Province: Hebei
- Prefecture: Hengshui
- District seat: Zhonghua Avenue Subdistrict

Area
  - Total: 602.47 km^{2} (232.61 sq mi)

Population (2020 census)
  - Total: 608,586
  - Density: 1,010.2/km^{2} (2,616.3/sq mi)
- Time zone: UTC+8 (China Standard)
- Postal code: 053300
- Website: www.taocheng.gov.cn

Taocheng District (simplified Chinese: 桃城区; traditional Chinese: 桃城區; pinyin: Táochéng Qū; lit. 'Peach City') is district of Hengshui, Hebei province, China.

== History ==
In the 1930s, Taocheng was home to a branch of the Yellow Sand Society which reorganised itself as "People's Anti-Japanese National Salvation Self-Defence Corps", fighting against the expansion of the Empire of Japan in the area.

== Administrative divisions ==
Taocheng District is divided into 4 subdistricts, 3 towns and 1 township.

Subdistricts

- Hexi Subdistrict (河西街道), Hedong Subdistrict (河东街道), Lubei Subdistrict (路北街道), Zhonghua Avenue Subdistrict (中华大街街道)

Towns

- Zhengjiaheyan (郑家河沿镇), Zhaoquan (赵圈镇), Dengzhuang (邓庄镇)

Township

- Hejiazhuang Township (何家庄乡)

== Bibliography ==
- Ji, Xiaofeng; Shen, Youyi (1997). Supplements to the historical materials of the Republic of China. Beijing. ISBN 9787563320875.
