= Hengshui =

Coordinates: 37°44′20″N 115°40′08″E

Hengshui 衡水市
- Prefecture-level city
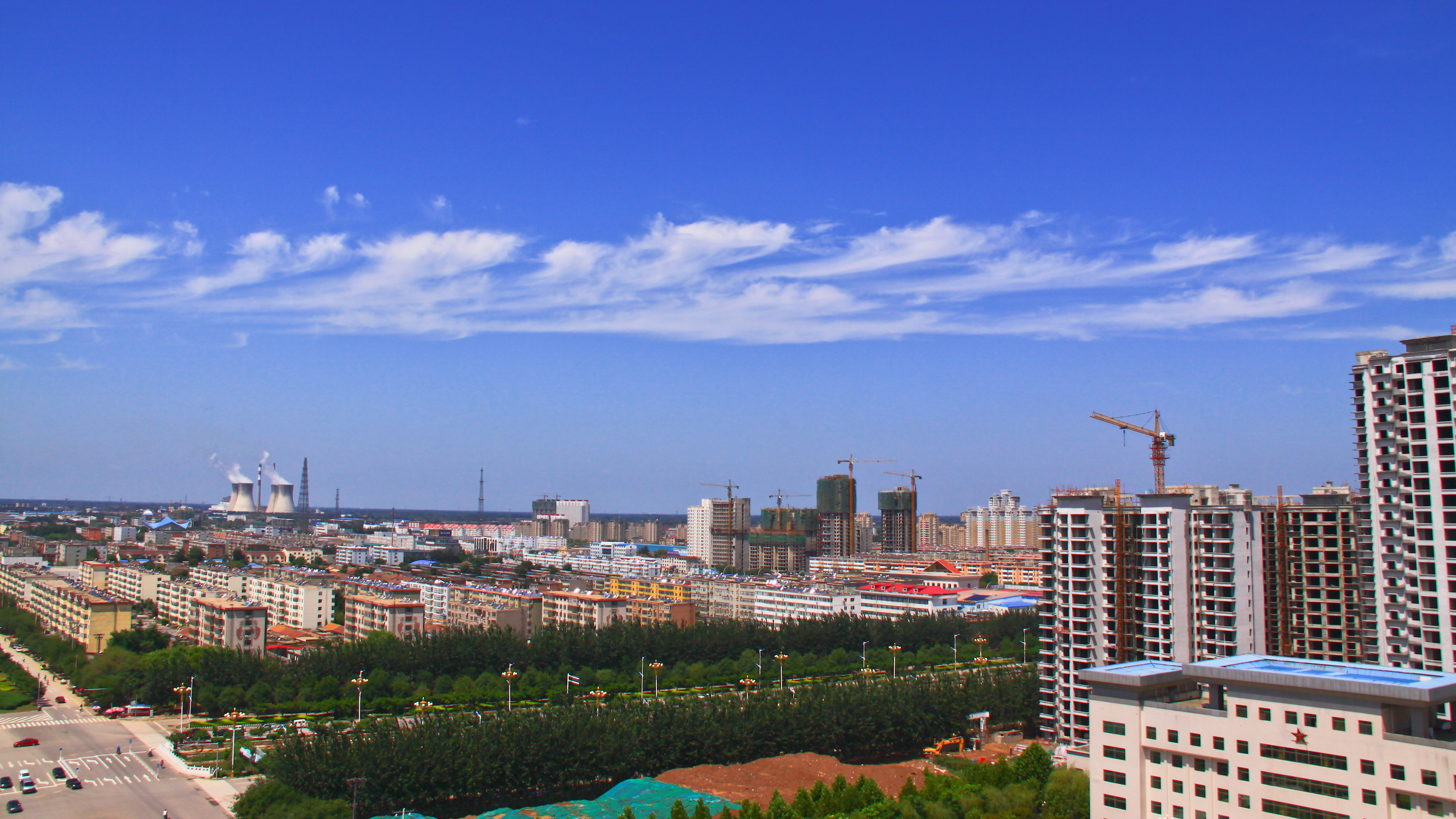
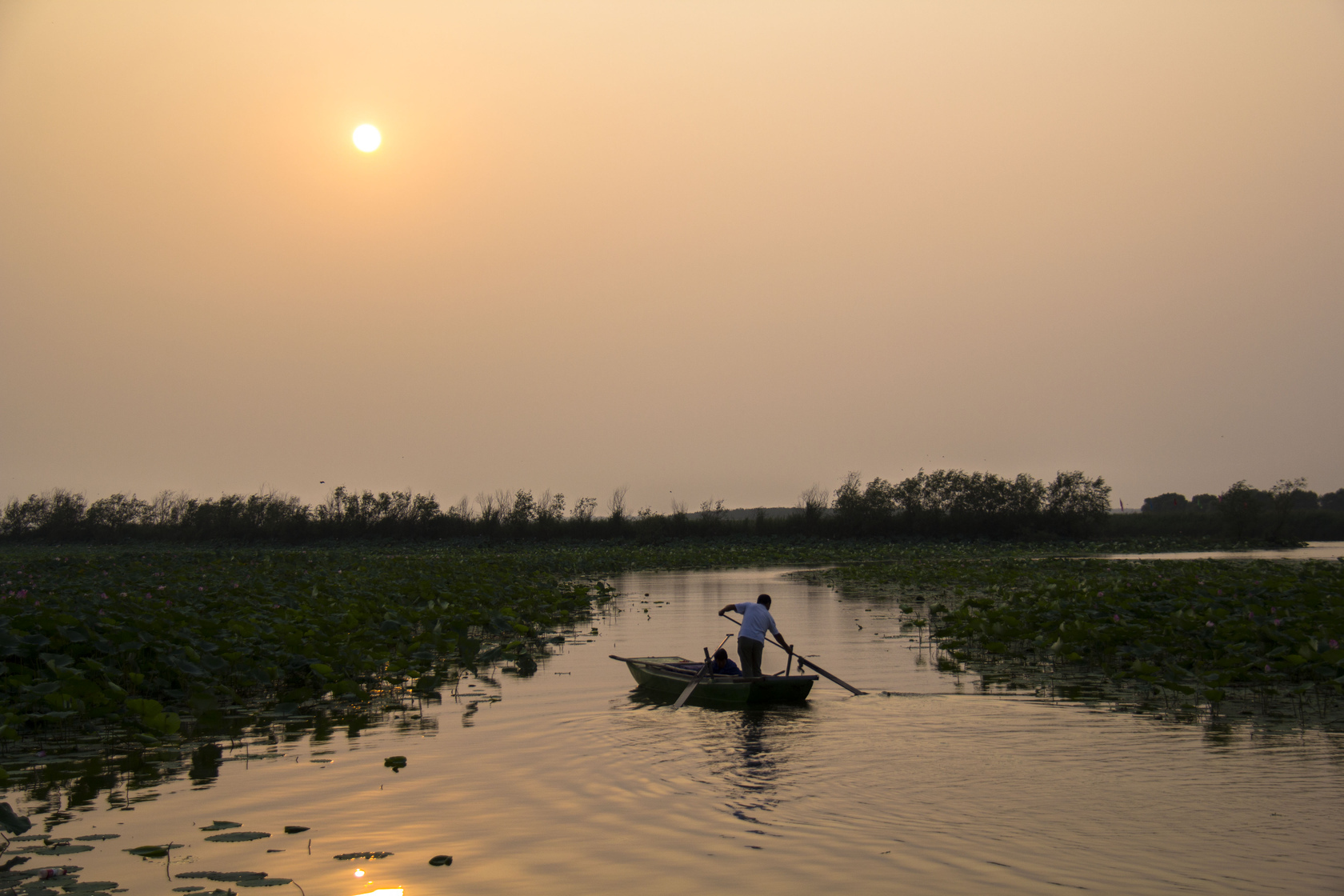
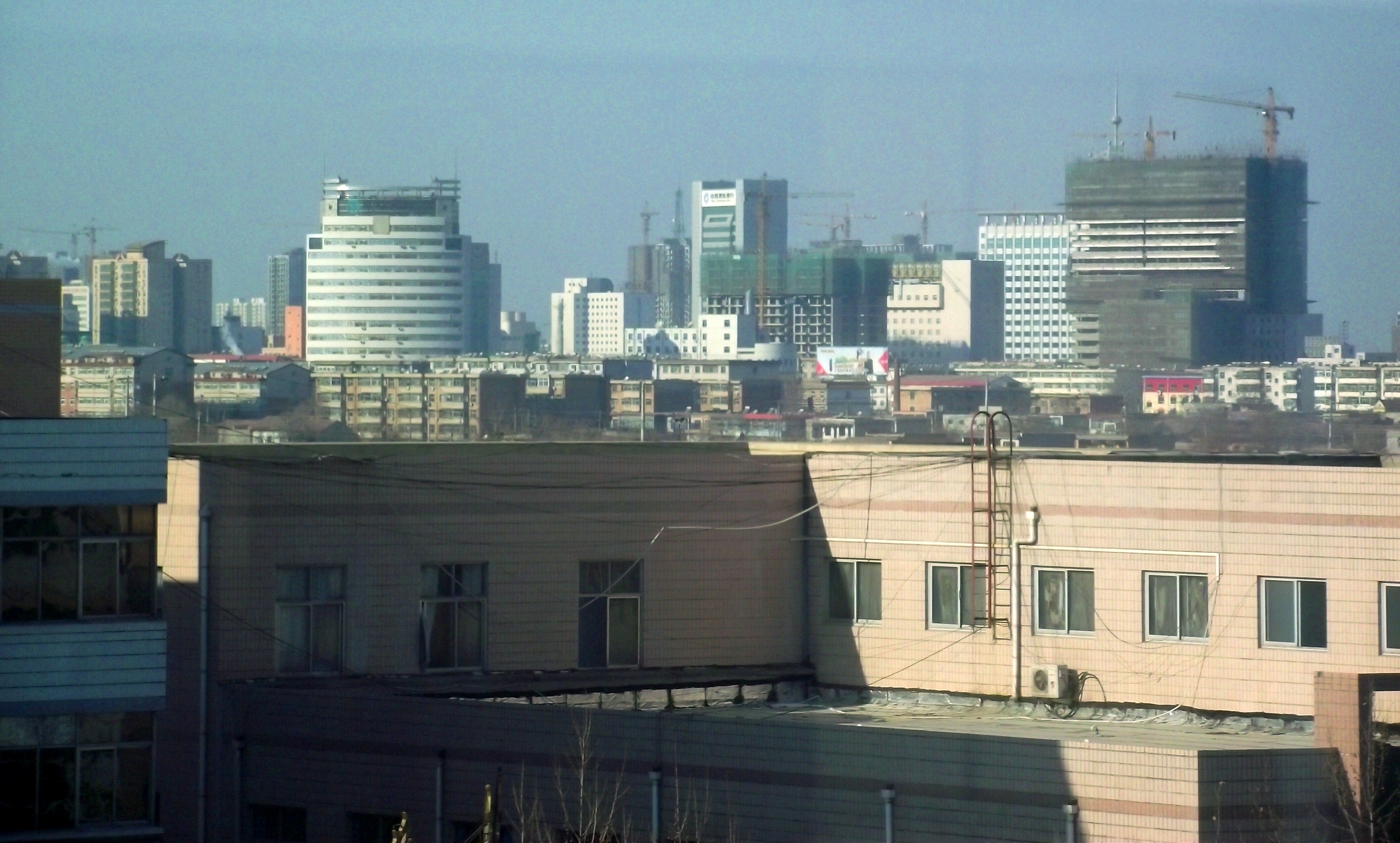
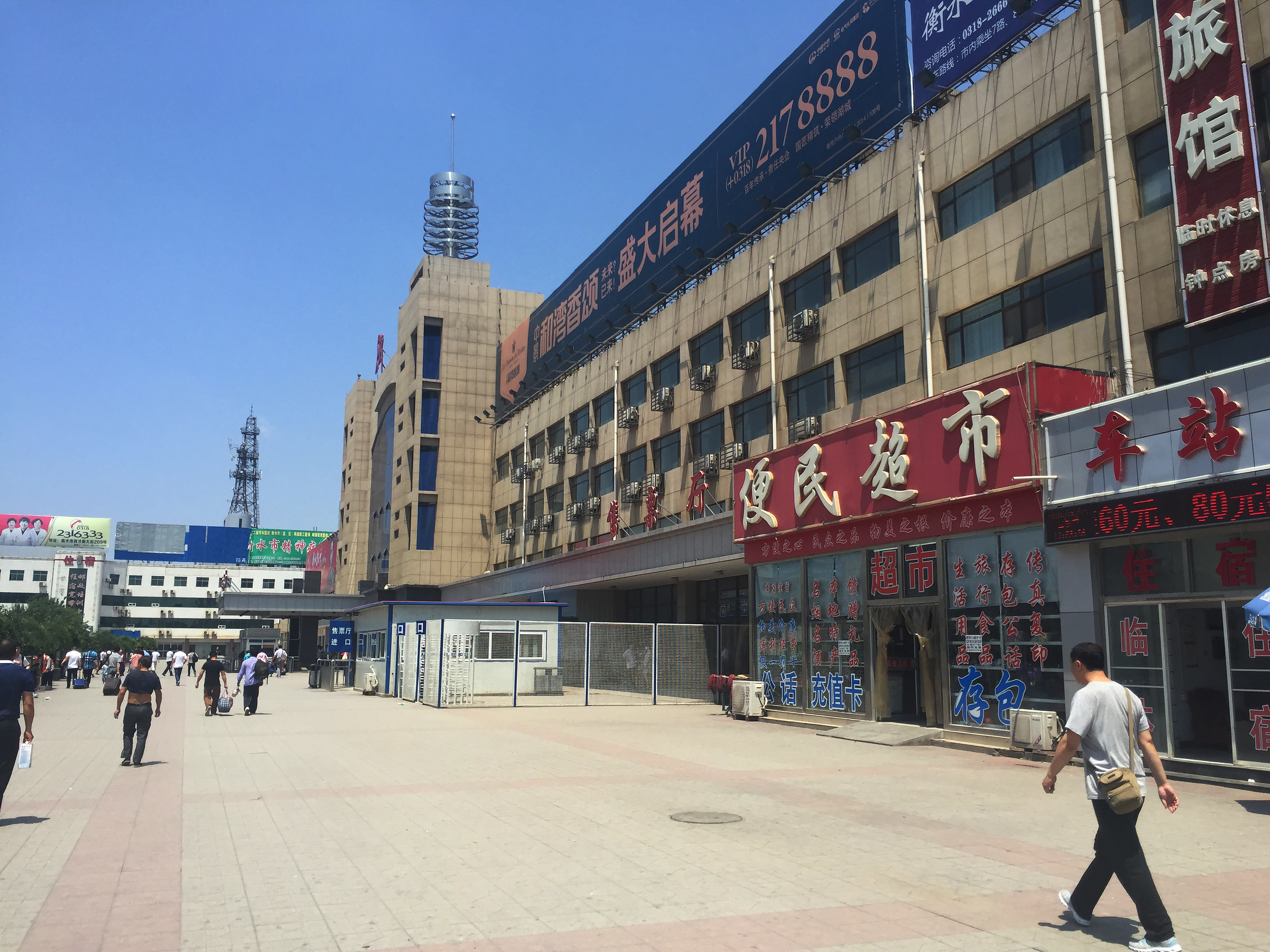
- From top, left to right: Downtown Taocheng District; Hengshui Lake; View from Hengshui Middle School; Hengshui Railway Station
- Nicknames: Peach City (桃城), Lake City (水市湖城)
- Interactive map of Hengshui
- Location of the city centre in Hebei Hengshui (Northern China) Hengshui (China)
- Country: People's Republic of China
- Province: Hebei
- Settled: 1265
- Established: May 31, 1996
- Municipal seat: Taocheng District

Area
  - Prefecture-level city: 8,836.95 km^{2} (3,411.97 sq mi)
  - Urban: 608.8 km^{2} (235.1 sq mi)
  - Metro: 608.8 km^{2} (235.1 sq mi)

Population (2020 census)
  - Prefecture-level city: 4,212,933
  - Density: 476.741/km^{2} (1,234.75/sq mi)
  - Urban: 805,000
  - Urban density: 1,320/km^{2} (3,420/sq mi)
  - Metro: 805,000
  - Metro density: 1,320/km^{2} (3,420/sq mi)

GDP
  - Prefecture-level city: CN¥ 155 billion US$ 22.5 billion
  - Per capita: CN¥ 27,543; US$4,422
- Time zone: UTC+8 (China Standard)
- ISO 3166 code: CN-HE-11

Hengshui
- Simplified Chinese: 衡水
- Literal meaning: "horizontal river"
Transcriptions
Standard Mandarin
- Hanyu Pinyin: Héngshuǐ

Hengshui (Chinese: 衡水) is a prefecture-level city in southern Hebei province, People's Republic of China, bordering Shandong to the southeast. It borders the cities of Shijiazhuang, the capital of Hebei, to the west, Xingtai to the south, and Baoding and Cangzhou to the north. As of the 2020 census, its population was 4,212,933 inhabitants, out of whom 805,000 lived in the built-up (or metro) area made of Taocheng urban district. At the end of 2024, the city's resident population was 4.1299 million, down 27,700 from the end of the previous year. The urbanization rate of the resident population is 58.17%. It is on the Beijing–Kowloon railway.

Hengshui has a long cultural history. During the Three Kingdoms period, Yuan Shao once stationed millions of troops in Jizhou to compete with Cao Cao. Dong Zhongshu, a great philosopher of the Western Han Dynasty and a great master of the Confucian school, was born in Hengshui Jing County. Hengshui now has two national-level cultural relics protection units: the Jingxian Fengshi Tombs and the Relic Pagoda, plus the Houzhong Han Tomb, Shuangzhong Han Tomb, Xiyuantou Han Tomb in Jizhou, the Qinglin Temple Pagoda in the old city, and the Taocheng District There are 19 provincial key cultural relics protection units including Baoyun Temple Pagoda.

== Administrative divisions ==
Map
#	Name	Hanzi	Hanyu Pinyin	Population (2010 census)	Area (km^{2})	Density (/km^{2})
1	Taocheng District	桃城区	Táochéng Qū	522,147	602.5	867
2	Jizhou District	冀州区	Jìzhōu Qū	362,013	918	394
3	Shenzhou City	深州市	Shēnzhōu Shì	566,087	1,244	455
4	Zaoqiang County	枣强县	Zǎoqiáng Xiàn	391,469	903	437
5	Wuyi County	武邑县	Wǔyì Xiàn	315,693	830	380
6	Wuqiang County	武强县	Wǔqiáng Xiàn	214,549	442	485
7	Raoyang County	饶阳县	Ráoyáng Xiàn	280,498	573	490
8	Anping County	安平县	Ānpíng Xiàn	328,512	493	666
9	Gucheng County	故城县	Gùchéng Xiàn	487,025	941	518
10	Jing County	景县	Jǐng Xiàn	528,693	1,183	447
11	Fucheng County	阜城县	Fùchéng Xiàn	341,087	698	489

== Education ==
Hengshui High School and Hengshui University are located in Hengshui.

Hebei Hengshui Middle School, referred to as "Hengzhong", was founded in 1951 and is located in Hengshui City, Hebei Province. It is one of the three key high schools directly under the Hengshui Municipal People's Government.

Hengshui University is located in Hengshui City, Hebei Province. It is a full-time general higher education institution approved by the Ministry of Education.

The school was formerly the Sixth Normal School of Zhili, which was founded in 1923. In 1949, it was restructured into Hebei Jixian Normal School. In 1960, it was moved to Hengshui and renamed Hebei Hengshui Normal School. In 1978, with the approval of the State Council, Hengshui Normal College was established on the basis of Hengshui Normal School. On May 17, 2004, it was upgraded to Hengshui College. In 2016, the school became a provincial master's program construction unit in Hebei Province.

== Sights ==
Hengshui Lake National Nature Reserve is adjacent to Hengshui City to the north and Jizhou City to the south, with a total area of 268 square kilometers. Its biodiversity is rich, with inland freshwater wetland ecosystems and national Class I and II birds as the main protection objects.

Luli (闾里) Ancient Town is located on the bank of Hengshui Lake, on the east side of National Highway 106, Weitun Town, Binhu New District, Hengshui City, with a total area of 4,150 acres and a total investment of 2.5 billion yuan. It is built with the theme of Han culture and relies on the wetland scenery of Hengshui Lake.

The Harrison International Peace Hospital is located in Hengshui. This comprehensive teaching and research hospital was named after Dr. Tillson Harrison, considered by the Chinese Communist Party a martyr to the Chinese Communist Revolution. Dr. Harrison, a Canadian, died in 1947 while transporting medical equipment and supplies. Some of this equipment is on display in an exhibition room in the hospital. The hospital uses both traditional Chinese medicine and modern western diagnostic and therapeutic technology.

The city is renowned as the centre for inside painting, mainly of small snuff bottles. Zhang Rucai was born in Hebei Province and since 1972, he started to learn the art of inside painting. In April 1996, he was conferred the title Master of Chinese Folk Arts & Crafts by UNESCO. The city has a museum and exhibition of the art of the inside painter - many complex paintings done on the inside of small snuff bottles as well as special larger pieces of glassware.

There is a Buddhist Temple on the outskirts of the city and a bridge in the old part of the city - one of the few remnants of the old town.

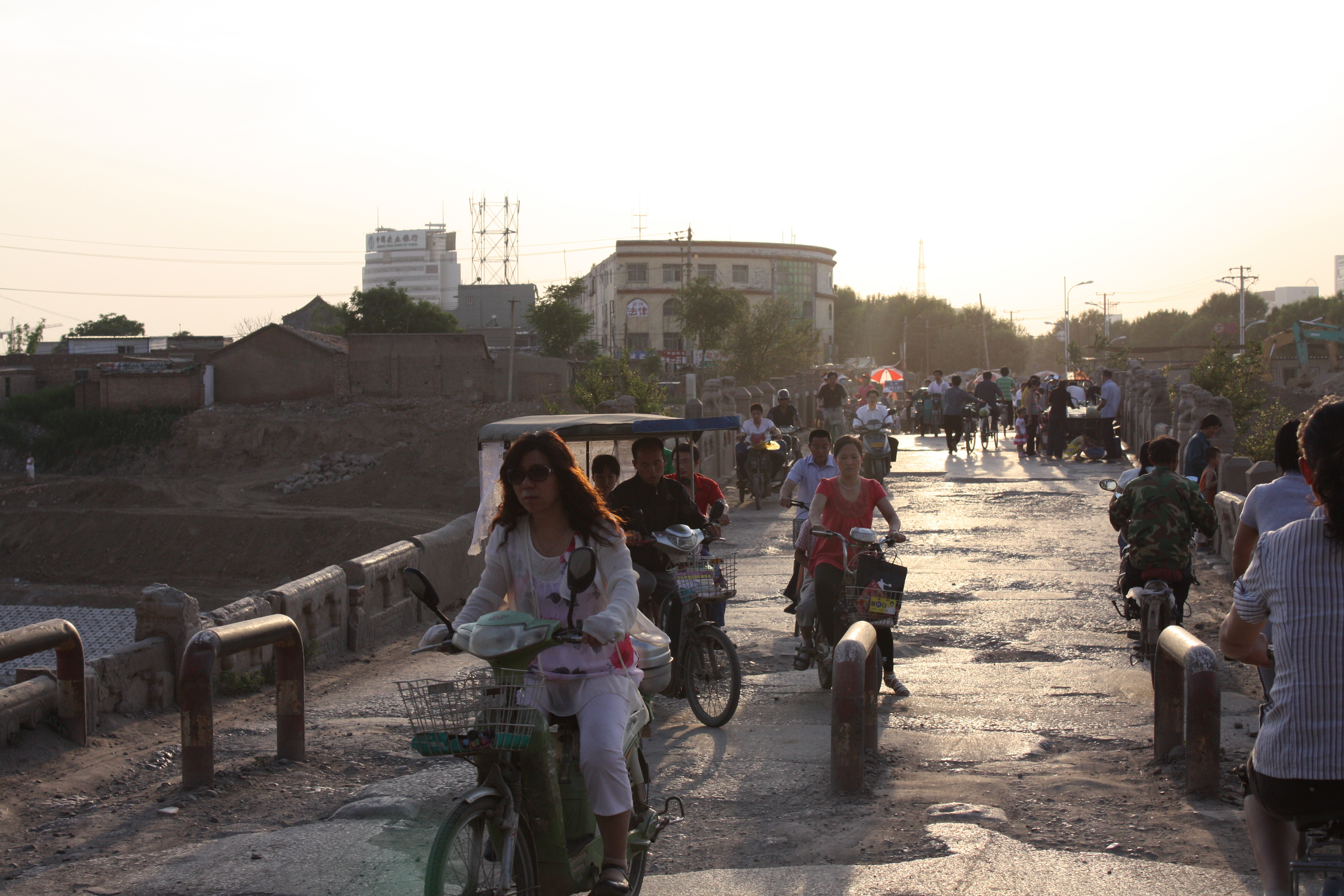
Hengshui Old Town Bridge

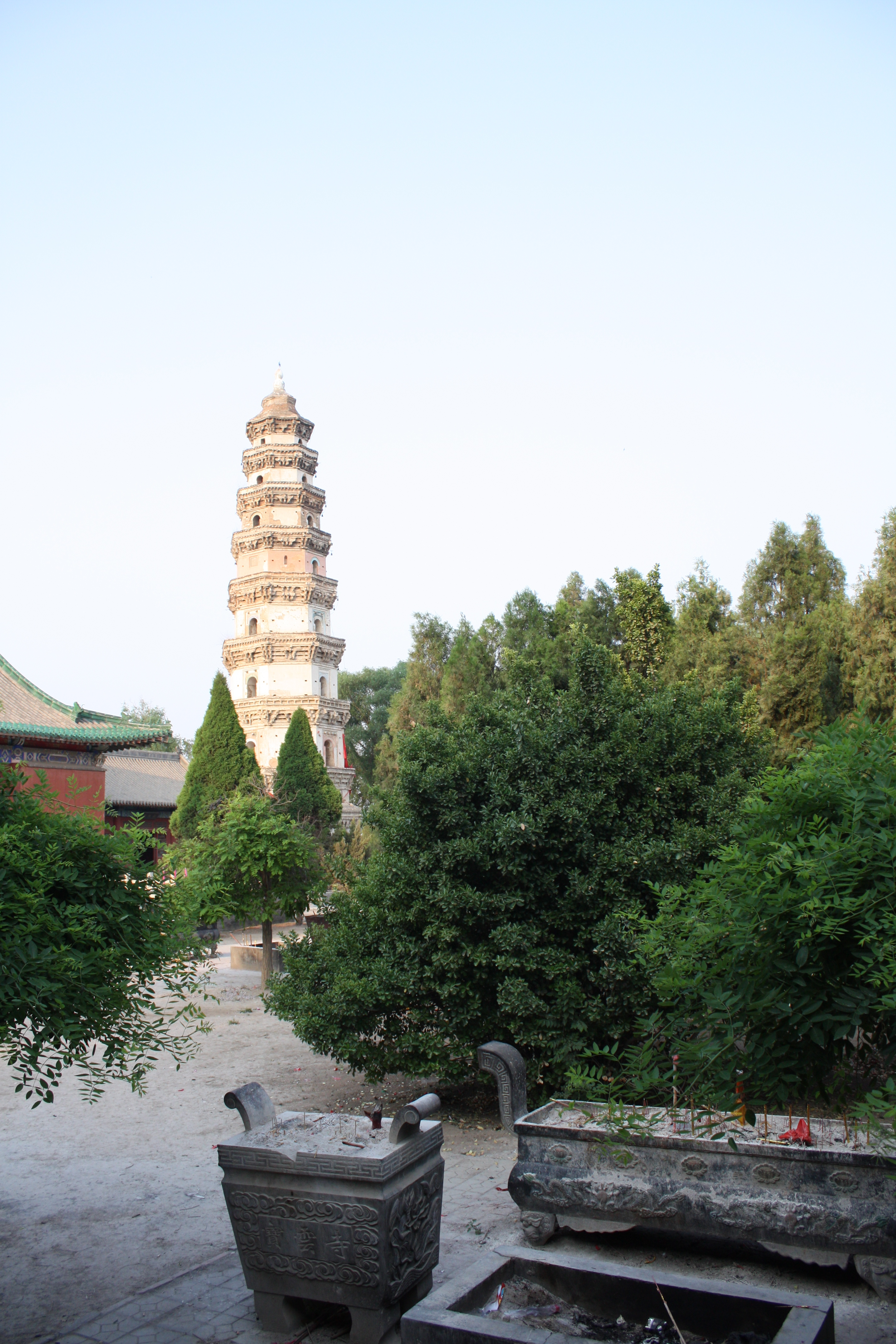
Hengshui Buddhist Temple

== Geography and climate ==
Hengshui has a cold semi-arid climate (Köppen: BSk), with hot, humid summers due to the East Asian Monsoon and very cold, mostly dry winters, owing to the prevailing dry north-westerly winds that reflect the influence of the vast Siberian anticyclone.

Precipitation totals 496.9 mm annually with more than three quarters falling during the summer half. Extreme temperatures range from -20.6 °C to 42.8 °C for the 1981-2010 period. Relative humidity is highest in the summer and lowest in the spring, preceding the monsoonal period. Due to the very dry winter conditions, snowfall is not common, though occurs almost every year, usually in small amounts.

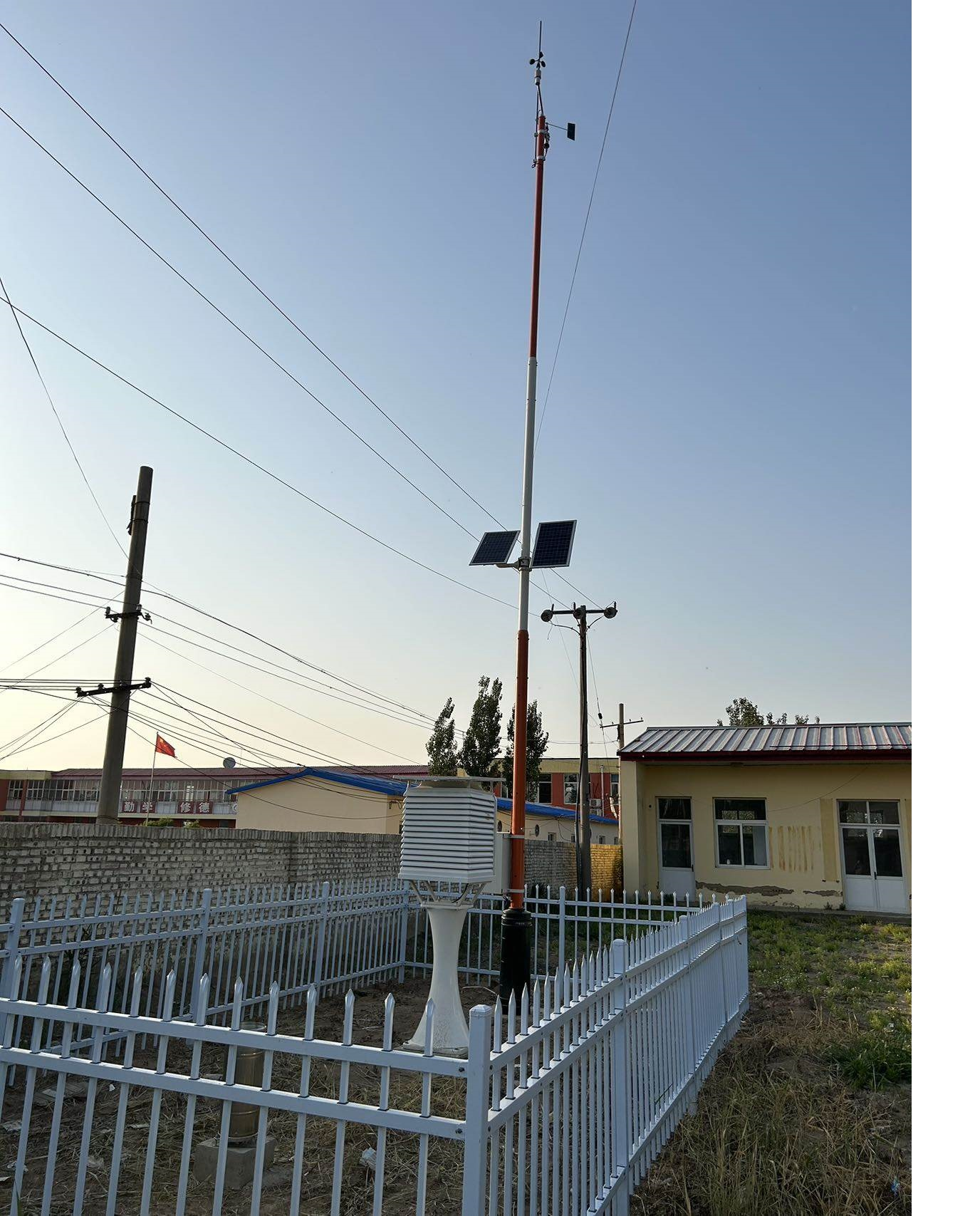
A meteorological station in a Stevenson screen in Hebei province, China

Climate data for Hengshui, elevation 21 m (69 ft), (1991–2020 normals, extremes 1981–2010)
Month	Jan	Feb	Mar	Apr	May	Jun	Jul	Aug	Sep	Oct	Nov	Dec	Year
Record high °C (°F)	16.8 (62.2)	23.3 (73.9)	31.5 (88.7)	34.6 (94.3)	40.6 (105.1)	40.6 (105.1)	42.8 (109.0)	38.3 (100.9)	37.2 (99.0)	32.2 (90.0)	26.2 (79.2)	18.6 (65.5)	42.8 (109.0)
Mean daily maximum °C (°F)	3.4 (38.1)	7.7 (45.9)	14.7 (58.5)	21.9 (71.4)	27.7 (81.9)	32.3 (90.1)	32.4 (90.3)	30.7 (87.3)	27.2 (81.0)	21.0 (69.8)	11.9 (53.4)	4.9 (40.8)	19.7 (67.4)
Daily mean °C (°F)	−2.3 (27.9)	1.4 (34.5)	8.1 (46.6)	15.3 (59.5)	21.4 (70.5)	26.1 (79.0)	27.5 (81.5)	25.9 (78.6)	21.2 (70.2)	14.5 (58.1)	6.0 (42.8)	−0.5 (31.1)	13.7 (56.7)
Mean daily minimum °C (°F)	−6.5 (20.3)	−3.2 (26.2)	2.8 (37.0)	9.6 (49.3)	15.5 (59.9)	20.5 (68.9)	23.2 (73.8)	22.0 (71.6)	16.6 (61.9)	9.5 (49.1)	1.6 (34.9)	−4.3 (24.3)	8.9 (48.1)
Record low °C (°F)	−18.3 (−0.9)	−15.5 (4.1)	−9.0 (15.8)	−1.7 (28.9)	4.5 (40.1)	10.2 (50.4)	16.8 (62.2)	13.4 (56.1)	6.7 (44.1)	−2.2 (28.0)	−16.4 (2.5)	−20.6 (−5.1)	−20.6 (−5.1)
Average precipitation mm (inches)	1.6 (0.06)	5.8 (0.23)	7.8 (0.31)	24.9 (0.98)	38.2 (1.50)	62.7 (2.47)	151.3 (5.96)	109.1 (4.30)	41.0 (1.61)	26.5 (1.04)	14.9 (0.59)	2.8 (0.11)	486.6 (19.16)
Average precipitation days (≥ 0.1 mm)	1.5	2.7	2.2	4.9	5.8	7.6	10.6	9.2	6.1	4.4	3.4	2.1	60.5
Average snowy days	2.8	3.3	1.1	0.2	0	0	0	0	0	0	1.2	2.5	11.1
Average relative humidity (%)	59	55	50	54	57	58	74	78	71	65	65	62	62
Mean monthly sunshine hours	157.4	171.4	225.4	240.5	267.0	238.2	200.5	208.5	204.0	197.1	161.2	152.7	2,423.9
Percentage possible sunshine	51	56	60	61	61	54	45	50	55	57	54	52	55
Source: China Meteorological Administration

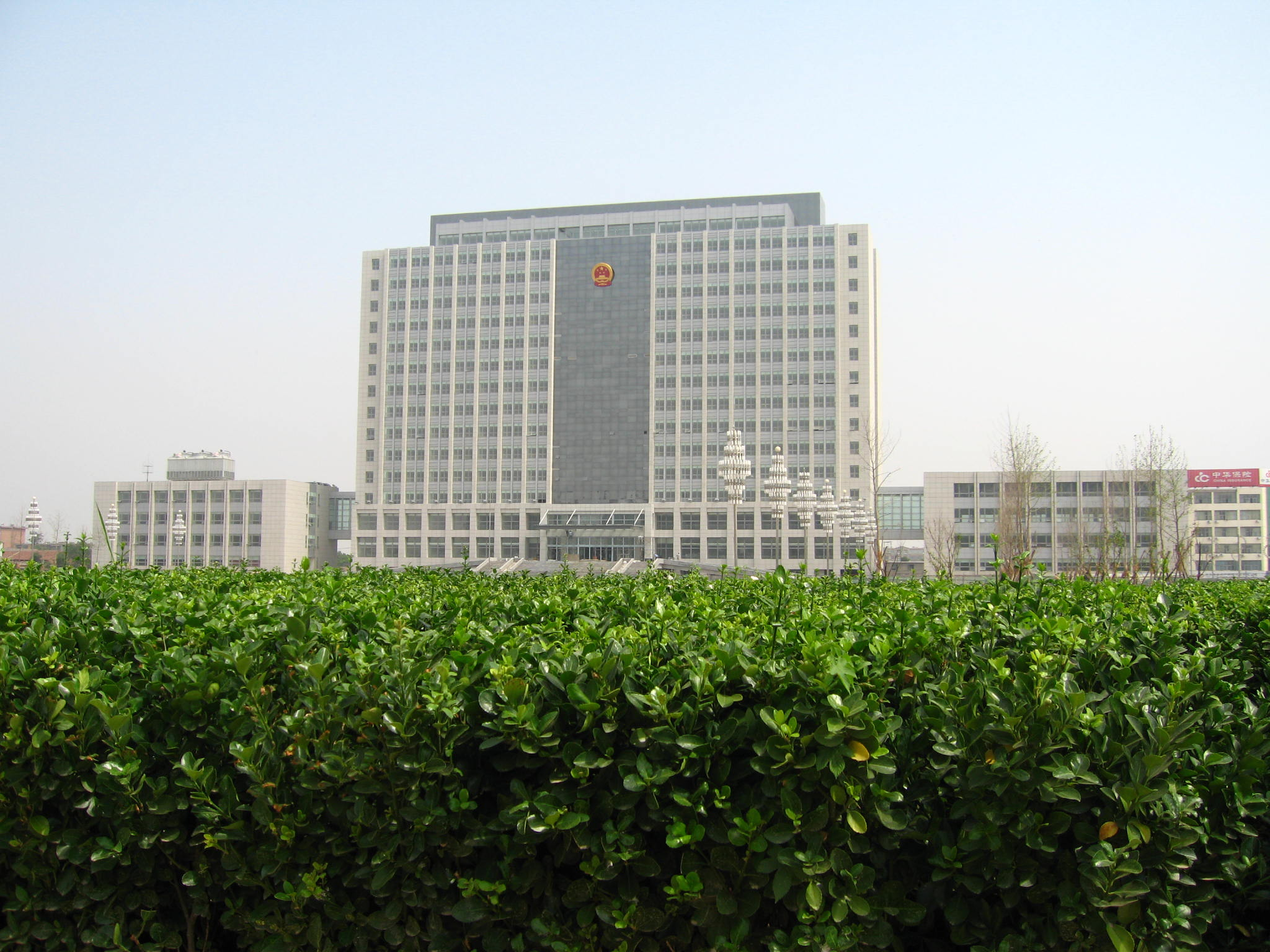
Hengshui City Hall, 2007

=== Air pollution ===
According to a survey made by "Global voices China" in February 2013, 7 cities in Hebei including Xingtai, Shijiazhuang, Baoding, Handan, Langfang, Hengshui and Tangshan, are among China's 10 most polluted cities.

== Religion ==
Hengshui is the seat of the Catholic Diocese of Hengshui.

== Gourmet food ==
Julu sausage is a specialty food in Julu Village, Heyan Town, Taocheng District, Hengshui. It uses Chinese medicinal materials and is not seasonal.

Wuyi Kouwan is a special delicacy in Wuyi County, Hengshui. The dunwan mentioned here is not a dish but a table of steamed bowls. It consists of 8 local "clean bowls", including Dongpo meat, lean meat, fat meat, elbow meat, rice noodles, mixed meat, and meatballs. pork ribs form a bowl and mat, and the dishes are fat or lean, meat or vegetarian, fat but not greasy, and are deeply loved by the masses.
