= List of administrative divisions of Hebei =

Administrative divisions of Hebei, a province of the People's Republic of China

Hebei Province
- Province
- Capital: Shijiazhuang

Prefecture-level divisions
- Prefectural cities: 11
- Administrative regions: 1

County level divisions
- County cities: 20
- Counties: 93
- Autonomous counties: 6
- Districts: 48

Township level divisions
- Towns: 939
- Townships: 954
- Ethnic townships: 51
- Subdistricts: 241
- District public offices: 1

Villages level divisions
- Communities: 4,221
- Administrative villages: 48,849

The administrative divisions of Hebei, a province of the People's Republic of China, consists of prefecture-level divisions subdivided into county-level divisions then subdivided into township-level divisions.

== Administrative divisions ==
All of these administrative divisions are explained in greater detail at Administrative divisions of the People's Republic of China. This chart lists only prefecture-level and county-level divisions of Hebei.

Prefecture level (Division code)	County Level				
Prefecture level (Division code)	Name	Chinese	Hanyu Pinyin	Division code	
Shijiazhuang city 石家庄市; Shíjiāzhuāng Shì (Capital) (1301 / SJW)	Chang'an District	长安区	Cháng'ān Qū	130102	CAQ
Shijiazhuang city 石家庄市; Shíjiāzhuāng Shì (Capital) (1301 / SJW)	Qiaoxi District	桥西区	Qiáoxī Qū	130104	QXQ
Shijiazhuang city 石家庄市; Shíjiāzhuāng Shì (Capital) (1301 / SJW)	Xinhua District	新华区	Xīnhuá Qū	130105	XHK
Shijiazhuang city 石家庄市; Shíjiāzhuāng Shì (Capital) (1301 / SJW)	Jingxing Mining District	井陉矿区	Jǐngxíng Kuàngqū	130107	JXK
Shijiazhuang city 石家庄市; Shíjiāzhuāng Shì (Capital) (1301 / SJW)	Yuhua District	裕华区	Yùhuá Qū	130108	YUH
Shijiazhuang city 石家庄市; Shíjiāzhuāng Shì (Capital) (1301 / SJW)	Gaocheng District	藁城区	Gǎochéng Qū	130109	GCO
Shijiazhuang city 石家庄市; Shíjiāzhuāng Shì (Capital) (1301 / SJW)	Luquan District	鹿泉区	Lùquán Qū	130110	LQL
Shijiazhuang city 石家庄市; Shíjiāzhuāng Shì (Capital) (1301 / SJW)	Luancheng District	栾城区	Luánchéng Qū	130111	LCO
Shijiazhuang city 石家庄市; Shíjiāzhuāng Shì (Capital) (1301 / SJW)	Jingxing County	井陉县	Jǐngxíng Xiàn	130121	JXJ
Shijiazhuang city 石家庄市; Shíjiāzhuāng Shì (Capital) (1301 / SJW)	Zhengding County	正定县	Zhèngdìng Xiàn	130123	ZDJ
Shijiazhuang city 石家庄市; Shíjiāzhuāng Shì (Capital) (1301 / SJW)	Xingtang County	行唐县	Xíngtáng Xiàn	130125	XTG
Shijiazhuang city 石家庄市; Shíjiāzhuāng Shì (Capital) (1301 / SJW)	Lingshou County	灵寿县	Língshòu Xiàn	130126	LSO
Shijiazhuang city 石家庄市; Shíjiāzhuāng Shì (Capital) (1301 / SJW)	Gaoyi County	高邑县	Gāoyì Xiàn	130127	GYJ
Shijiazhuang city 石家庄市; Shíjiāzhuāng Shì (Capital) (1301 / SJW)	Shenze County	深泽县	Shēnzé Xiàn	130128	SZE
Shijiazhuang city 石家庄市; Shíjiāzhuāng Shì (Capital) (1301 / SJW)	Zanhuang County	赞皇县	Zànhuáng Xiàn	130129	ZHG
Shijiazhuang city 石家庄市; Shíjiāzhuāng Shì (Capital) (1301 / SJW)	Wuji County	无极县	Wújí Xiàn	130130	WJI
Shijiazhuang city 石家庄市; Shíjiāzhuāng Shì (Capital) (1301 / SJW)	Pingshan County	平山县	Píngshān Xiàn	130131	PSH
Shijiazhuang city 石家庄市; Shíjiāzhuāng Shì (Capital) (1301 / SJW)	Yuanshi County	元氏县	Yuánshì Xiàn	130132	YSI
Shijiazhuang city 石家庄市; Shíjiāzhuāng Shì (Capital) (1301 / SJW)	Zhaoxian County (Note: Official name registered by the Ministry of Civil Affairs.)	赵县	Zhàoxiàn	130133	ZAO
Shijiazhuang city 石家庄市; Shíjiāzhuāng Shì (Capital) (1301 / SJW)	Xinji city	辛集市	Xīnjí Shì	130181	XJS
Shijiazhuang city 石家庄市; Shíjiāzhuāng Shì (Capital) (1301 / SJW)	Jinzhou city	晋州市	Jìnzhōu Shì	130183	JZJ
Shijiazhuang city 石家庄市; Shíjiāzhuāng Shì (Capital) (1301 / SJW)	Xinle city	新乐市	Xīnlè Shì	130184	XLE
Tangshan city 唐山市; Tángshān Shì (1302 / TGS)	Lunan District	路南区	Lù'nán Qū	130202	LNB
Tangshan city 唐山市; Tángshān Shì (1302 / TGS)	Lubei District	路北区	Lùběi Qū	130203	LBQ
Tangshan city 唐山市; Tángshān Shì (1302 / TGS)	Guye District	古冶区	Gǔyě Qū	130204	GYE
Tangshan city 唐山市; Tángshān Shì (1302 / TGS)	Kaiping District	开平区	Kāipíng Qū	130205	KPQ
Tangshan city 唐山市; Tángshān Shì (1302 / TGS)	Fengnan District	丰南区	Fēngnán Qū	130207	FNQ
Tangshan city 唐山市; Tángshān Shì (1302 / TGS)	Fengrun District	丰润区	Fēngrùn Qū	130208	FRN
Tangshan city 唐山市; Tángshān Shì (1302 / TGS)	Caofeidian District	曹妃甸区	Cáofēidiàn Qū	130209	CFD
Tangshan city 唐山市; Tángshān Shì (1302 / TGS)	Luannan County	滦南县	Luánnán Xiàn	130224	LNJ
Tangshan city 唐山市; Tángshān Shì (1302 / TGS)	Laoting County	乐亭县	Laòtíng Xiàn (Note: not Lètíng)	130225	LTJ
Tangshan city 唐山市; Tángshān Shì (1302 / TGS)	Qianxi County	迁西县	Qiānxī Xiàn	130227	QXX
Tangshan city 唐山市; Tángshān Shì (1302 / TGS)	Yutian County	玉田县	Yùtián Xiàn	130229	YTJ
Tangshan city 唐山市; Tángshān Shì (1302 / TGS)	Zunhua city	遵化市	Zūnhuà Shì	130281	ZNH
Tangshan city 唐山市; Tángshān Shì (1302 / TGS)	Qian'an city	迁安市	Qiān'ān Shì	130283	QAS
Tangshan city 唐山市; Tángshān Shì (1302 / TGS)	Luanzhou city	滦州市	Luánzhōu Shì	130284	
Qinhuangdao city 秦皇岛市; Qínhuángdǎo Shì (1303 / SHP)	Haigang District	海港区	Hǎigǎng Qū	130302	HGG
Qinhuangdao city 秦皇岛市; Qínhuángdǎo Shì (1303 / SHP)	Shanhaiguan District	山海关区	Shānhǎiguān Qū	130303	SHG
Qinhuangdao city 秦皇岛市; Qínhuángdǎo Shì (1303 / SHP)	Beidaihe District	北戴河区	Běidàihé Qū	130304	BDH
Qinhuangdao city 秦皇岛市; Qínhuángdǎo Shì (1303 / SHP)	Funing District	抚宁区	Fǔníng Qū	130305	FNU
Qinhuangdao city 秦皇岛市; Qínhuángdǎo Shì (1303 / SHP)	Qinglong County (Note: Conventional name: Qinglong Manchu Autonomous County; Chinese: 青龙满族自治县; pinyin: Qīnglóng Mǎnzú Zìzhìxiàn)	青龙县	Qīnglóng Xiàn	130321	QLM
Qinhuangdao city 秦皇岛市; Qínhuángdǎo Shì (1303 / SHP)	Changli County	昌黎县	Chānglí Xiàn	130322	CGL
Qinhuangdao city 秦皇岛市; Qínhuángdǎo Shì (1303 / SHP)	Lulong County	卢龙县	Lúlóng Xiàn	130324	LLG
Handan city 邯郸市; Hándān Shì (1304 / HDS)	Hanshan District	邯山区	Hánshān Qū	130402	HHD
Handan city 邯郸市; Hándān Shì (1304 / HDS)	Congtai District	丛台区	Cóngtái Qū	130403	CTQ
Handan city 邯郸市; Hándān Shì (1304 / HDS)	Fuxing District	复兴区	Fùxīng Qū	130404	FXQ
Handan city 邯郸市; Hándān Shì (1304 / HDS)	Fengfeng Mining District	峰峰矿区	Fēngfēng Kuàngqū	130406	FFK
Handan city 邯郸市; Hándān Shì (1304 / HDS)	Feixiang District	肥乡区	Féixiāng Qū	130407	FXA
Handan city 邯郸市; Hándān Shì (1304 / HDS)	Yongnian District	永年区	Yǒngnián Qū	130408	YNO
Handan city 邯郸市; Hándān Shì (1304 / HDS)	Linzhang County	临漳县	Línzhāng Xiàn	130423	LNZ
Handan city 邯郸市; Hándān Shì (1304 / HDS)	Cheng'an County	成安县	Chéng'ān Xiàn	130424	CAJ
Handan city 邯郸市; Hándān Shì (1304 / HDS)	Daming County	大名县	Dàmíng Xiàn	130425	DMX
Handan city 邯郸市; Hándān Shì (1304 / HDS)	Shexian County	涉县	Shèxiàn	130426	SEJ
Handan city 邯郸市; Hándān Shì (1304 / HDS)	Cixian County	磁县	Cíxiàn	130427	CIX
Handan city 邯郸市; Hándān Shì (1304 / HDS)	Qiuxian County	邱县	Qiūxiàn	130430	QIU
Handan city 邯郸市; Hándān Shì (1304 / HDS)	Jize County	鸡泽县	Jīzé Xiàn	130431	JZE
Handan city 邯郸市; Hándān Shì (1304 / HDS)	Guangping County	广平县	Guǎngpíng Xiàn	130432	GPX
Handan city 邯郸市; Hándān Shì (1304 / HDS)	Guantao County	馆陶县	Guǎntáo Xiàn	130433	GTO
Handan city 邯郸市; Hándān Shì (1304 / HDS)	Weixian County	魏县	Wèixiàn	130434	WEI
Handan city 邯郸市; Hándān Shì (1304 / HDS)	Quzhou County	曲周县	Qǔzhōu Xiàn	130435	QZX
Handan city 邯郸市; Hándān Shì (1304 / HDS)	Wu'an city	武安市	Wǔ'ān Shì	130481	WUA
Xingtai city 邢台市; Xíngtái Shì (1305 / XTS)	Xiangdu District	襄都区	Xiāngdū Qū	130504	
Xingtai city 邢台市; Xíngtái Shì (1305 / XTS)	Xindu District	信都区	Xìndū Qū	130505	
Xingtai city 邢台市; Xíngtái Shì (1305 / XTS)	Renze District	任泽区	Rénzé Qū	130506	
Xingtai city 邢台市; Xíngtái Shì (1305 / XTS)	Nanhe District	南和区	Nánhé Qū	130507	
Xingtai city 邢台市; Xíngtái Shì (1305 / XTS)	Lincheng County	临城县	Línchéng Xiàn	130522	LNC
Xingtai city 邢台市; Xíngtái Shì (1305 / XTS)	Neiqiu County	内丘县	Nèiqiū Xiàn	130523	NQU
Xingtai city 邢台市; Xíngtái Shì (1305 / XTS)	Baixiang County	柏乡县	Bǎixiāng Xiàn	130524	BXG
Xingtai city 邢台市; Xíngtái Shì (1305 / XTS)	Longyao County	隆尧县	Lóngyáo Xiàn	130525	LYO
Xingtai city 邢台市; Xíngtái Shì (1305 / XTS)	Ningjin County	宁晋县	Níngjìn Xiàn	130528	NJN
Xingtai city 邢台市; Xíngtái Shì (1305 / XTS)	Julu County	巨鹿县	Jùlù Xiàn	130529	JLU
Xingtai city 邢台市; Xíngtái Shì (1305 / XTS)	Xinhe County	新河县	Xīnhé Xiàn	130530	XHJ
Xingtai city 邢台市; Xíngtái Shì (1305 / XTS)	Guangzong County	广宗县	Guǎngzōng Xiàn	130531	GZJ
Xingtai city 邢台市; Xíngtái Shì (1305 / XTS)	Pingxiang County	平乡县	Píngxiāng Xiàn	130532	PXX
Xingtai city 邢台市; Xíngtái Shì (1305 / XTS)	Weixian County	威县	Wēixiàn	130533	WEX
Xingtai city 邢台市; Xíngtái Shì (1305 / XTS)	Qinghe County	清河县	Qīnghé Xiàn	130534	QHE
Xingtai city 邢台市; Xíngtái Shì (1305 / XTS)	Linxi County	临西县	Línxī Xiàn	130535	LXI
Xingtai city 邢台市; Xíngtái Shì (1305 / XTS)	Nangong city	南宫市	Nángōng Shì	130581	NGO
Xingtai city 邢台市; Xíngtái Shì (1305 / XTS)	Shahe city	沙河市	Shāhé Shì	130582	SHS
Baoding city 保定市; Bǎodìng Shì (1306 / BDS)	Jingxiu District	竟秀区	Jìngxiù Qū	130602	JXB
Baoding city 保定市; Bǎodìng Shì (1306 / BDS)	Lianchi District	莲池区	Liánchí Qū	130606	LCV
Baoding city 保定市; Bǎodìng Shì (1306 / BDS)	Mancheng District	满城区	Mǎnchéng Qū	130607	MCG
Baoding city 保定市; Bǎodìng Shì (1306 / BDS)	Qingyuan District	清苑区	Qīngyuàn Qū	130608	QYB
Baoding city 保定市; Bǎodìng Shì (1306 / BDS)	Xushui District	徐水区	Xúshuǐ Qū	130609	XSC
Baoding city 保定市; Bǎodìng Shì (1306 / BDS)	Laishui County	涞水县	Láishuǐ Xiàn	130623	LSM
Baoding city 保定市; Bǎodìng Shì (1306 / BDS)	Fuping County	阜平县	Fùpíng Xiàn	130624	FUP
Baoding city 保定市; Bǎodìng Shì (1306 / BDS)	Dingxing County	定兴县	Dìngxīng Xiàn	130626	DXG
Baoding city 保定市; Bǎodìng Shì (1306 / BDS)	Tangxian County	唐县	Tángxiàn	130627	TAG
Baoding city 保定市; Bǎodìng Shì (1306 / BDS)	Gaoyang County	高阳县	Gāoyáng Xiàn	130628	GAY
Baoding city 保定市; Bǎodìng Shì (1306 / BDS)	Rongcheng County	容城县	Róngchéng Xiàn	130629	RCX
Baoding city 保定市; Bǎodìng Shì (1306 / BDS)	Laiyuan County	涞源县	Láiyuán Xiàn	130630	LIY
Baoding city 保定市; Bǎodìng Shì (1306 / BDS)	Wangdu County	望都县	Wàngdū Xiàn	130631	WDU
Baoding city 保定市; Bǎodìng Shì (1306 / BDS)	Anxin County	安新县	Ānxīn Xiàn	130632	AXX
Baoding city 保定市; Bǎodìng Shì (1306 / BDS)	Yixian County	易县	Yìxiàn	130633	YII
Baoding city 保定市; Bǎodìng Shì (1306 / BDS)	Quyang County	曲阳县	Qūyáng Xiàn	130634	QUY
Baoding city 保定市; Bǎodìng Shì (1306 / BDS)	Lixian County	蠡县	Lǐxiàn (Note: not Líxiàn)	130635	LXJ
Baoding city 保定市; Bǎodìng Shì (1306 / BDS)	Shunping County	顺平县	Shùnpíng Xiàn	130636	SPI
Baoding city 保定市; Bǎodìng Shì (1306 / BDS)	Boye County	博野县	Bóyě Xiàn	130637	BYE
Baoding city 保定市; Bǎodìng Shì (1306 / BDS)	Xiongxian County	雄县	Xióngxiàn	130638	XOX
Baoding city 保定市; Bǎodìng Shì (1306 / BDS)	Zhuozhou city	涿州市	Zhuōzhōu Shì	130681	ZZO
Baoding city 保定市; Bǎodìng Shì (1306 / BDS)	Dingzhou city	定州市	Dìngzhōu Shì	130682	DZO
Baoding city 保定市; Bǎodìng Shì (1306 / BDS)	Anguo city	安国市	Ānguó Shì	130683	AGO
Baoding city 保定市; Bǎodìng Shì (1306 / BDS)	Gaobeidian city	高碑店市	Gāobēidiàn Shì	130684	GBD
Zhangjiakou city 张家口市; Zhāngjiākǒu Shì (1307 / ZJK)	Qiaodong District	桥东区	Qiáodōng Qū	130702	QDZ
Zhangjiakou city 张家口市; Zhāngjiākǒu Shì (1307 / ZJK)	Qiaoxi District	桥西区	Qiáoxī Qū	130703	QXI
Zhangjiakou city 张家口市; Zhāngjiākǒu Shì (1307 / ZJK)	Xuanhua District	宣化区	Xuānhuà Qū	130705	XHZ
Zhangjiakou city 张家口市; Zhāngjiākǒu Shì (1307 / ZJK)	Xiahuayuan District	下花园区	Xiàhuāyuán Qū	130706	XHY
Zhangjiakou city 张家口市; Zhāngjiākǒu Shì (1307 / ZJK)	Wanquan District	万全区	Wànquán Qū	130707	WQW
Zhangjiakou city 张家口市; Zhāngjiākǒu Shì (1307 / ZJK)	Chongli District	崇礼区	Chónglǐ Qū	130708	CHL
Zhangjiakou city 张家口市; Zhāngjiākǒu Shì (1307 / ZJK)	Zhangbei County	张北县	Zhāngběi Xiàn	130722	ZGB
Zhangjiakou city 张家口市; Zhāngjiākǒu Shì (1307 / ZJK)	Kangbao County	康保县	Kāngbǎo Xiàn	130723	KBO
Zhangjiakou city 张家口市; Zhāngjiākǒu Shì (1307 / ZJK)	Guyuan County	沽源县	Gūyuán Xiàn	130724	GUY
Zhangjiakou city 张家口市; Zhāngjiākǒu Shì (1307 / ZJK)	Shangyi County	尚义县	Shàngyì Xiàn	130725	SYK
Zhangjiakou city 张家口市; Zhāngjiākǒu Shì (1307 / ZJK)	Yuxian County	蔚县	Yùxiàn (Note: not Wèixiàn)	130726	YXJ
Zhangjiakou city 张家口市; Zhāngjiākǒu Shì (1307 / ZJK)	Yangyuan County	阳原县	Yángyuán Xiàn	130727	YYN
Zhangjiakou city 张家口市; Zhāngjiākǒu Shì (1307 / ZJK)	Huai'an County	怀安县	Huái'ān Xiàn	130728	HAX
Zhangjiakou city 张家口市; Zhāngjiākǒu Shì (1307 / ZJK)	Huailai County	怀来县	Huáilái Xiàn	130730	HLA
Zhangjiakou city 张家口市; Zhāngjiākǒu Shì (1307 / ZJK)	Zhuolu County	涿鹿县	Zhuōlù Xiàn	130731	ZLU
Zhangjiakou city 张家口市; Zhāngjiākǒu Shì (1307 / ZJK)	Chicheng County	赤城县	Chìchéng Xiàn	130732	CCX
Chengde city 承德市; Chéngdé Shì (1308 / CDS)	Shuangqiao District	双桥区	Shuāngqiáo Qū	130802	SQO
Chengde city 承德市; Chéngdé Shì (1308 / CDS)	Shuangluan District	双滦区	Shuāngluán Qū	130803	SLQ
Chengde city 承德市; Chéngdé Shì (1308 / CDS)	Yingshouyingzi Mining District	鹰手营子矿区	Yīngshǒuyíngzi Kuàngqū	130804	YSY
Chengde city 承德市; Chéngdé Shì (1308 / CDS)	Chengde County	承德县	Chéngdé Xiàn	130821	CDX
Chengde city 承德市; Chéngdé Shì (1308 / CDS)	Xinglong County	兴隆县	Xīnglóng Xiàn	130822	XLJ
Chengde city 承德市; Chéngdé Shì (1308 / CDS)	Luanping County	滦平县	Luánpíng Xiàn	130824	LUP
Chengde city 承德市; Chéngdé Shì (1308 / CDS)	Longhua County	隆化县	Lónghuà Xiàn	130825	LHJ
Chengde city 承德市; Chéngdé Shì (1308 / CDS)	Fengning County (Note: Conventional name: Fengning Manchu Autonomous County; Chinese: 丰宁满族自治县; pinyin: Fēngníng Mǎnzú Zìzhìxiàn)	丰宁县	Fēngníng Xiàn	130826	FNJ
Chengde city 承德市; Chéngdé Shì (1308 / CDS)	Kuancheng County (Note: Conventional name: Kuancheng Manchu Autonomous County; Chinese: 宽城满族自治县; pinyin: Kuānchéng Mǎnzú Zìzhìxiàn)	宽城县	Kuānchéng Xiàn	130827	KCX
Chengde city 承德市; Chéngdé Shì (1308 / CDS)	Weichang County (Note: Conventional name: Weichang Manchu and Mongol Autonomous County; Chinese: 围场满族蒙古族自治县; pinyin: Wéichǎng Mǎnzú Měnggǔzú Zìzhìxiàn)	围场县	Wéichǎng Xiàn	130828	WCJ
Chengde city 承德市; Chéngdé Shì (1308 / CDS)	Pingquan city	平泉市	Píngquán Shì	130881	PQS
Cangzhou city 沧州市; Cāngzhōu Shì (1309 / CGZ)	Xinhua District	新华区	Xīnhuá Qū	130902	XHF
Cangzhou city 沧州市; Cāngzhōu Shì (1309 / CGZ)	Yunhe District	运河区	Yùnhé Qū	130903	YHC
Cangzhou city 沧州市; Cāngzhōu Shì (1309 / CGZ)	Cangxian County	沧县	Cāngxiàn	130921	CAG
Cangzhou city 沧州市; Cāngzhōu Shì (1309 / CGZ)	Qingxian County	青县	Qīngxiàn	130922	QIG
Cangzhou city 沧州市; Cāngzhōu Shì (1309 / CGZ)	Dongguang County	东光县	Dōngguāng Xiàn	130923	DGU
Cangzhou city 沧州市; Cāngzhōu Shì (1309 / CGZ)	Haixing County	海兴县	Hǎixīng Xiàn	130924	HXG
Cangzhou city 沧州市; Cāngzhōu Shì (1309 / CGZ)	Yanshan County	盐山县	Yánshān Xiàn	130925	YNS
Cangzhou city 沧州市; Cāngzhōu Shì (1309 / CGZ)	Suning County	肃宁县	Sùníng Xiàn	130926	SNG
Cangzhou city 沧州市; Cāngzhōu Shì (1309 / CGZ)	Nanpi County	南皮县	Nánpí Xiàn	130927	NPI
Cangzhou city 沧州市; Cāngzhōu Shì (1309 / CGZ)	Wuqiao County	吴桥县	Wúqiáo Xiàn	130928	WUQ
Cangzhou city 沧州市; Cāngzhōu Shì (1309 / CGZ)	Xianxian County	献县	Xiànxiàn	130929	XXN
Cangzhou city 沧州市; Cāngzhōu Shì (1309 / CGZ)	Mengcun County (Note: Conventional name: Mengcun Hui Autonomous County; Chinese: 孟村回族自治县; pinyin: Mèngcūn Huízú Zìzhìxiàn)	孟村县	Mèngcūn Xiàn	130930	MCN
Cangzhou city 沧州市; Cāngzhōu Shì (1309 / CGZ)	Botou city	泊头市	Bótóu Shì	130981	BOT
Cangzhou city 沧州市; Cāngzhōu Shì (1309 / CGZ)	Renqiu city (Note: North China Oilfield Administrative Region (华北油田地区; Huáběiyóutián Dìqū) a special jurisdiction with prefectural level power. The special jurisdiction is located within Renqiu.)	任丘市	Rénqiū Shì (Note: not Rènqiū)	130982	RQS
Cangzhou city 沧州市; Cāngzhōu Shì (1309 / CGZ)	Huanghua city	黄骅市	Huánghuá Shì	130983	HHJ
Cangzhou city 沧州市; Cāngzhōu Shì (1309 / CGZ)	Hejian city	河间市	Héjiān Shì	130984	HJN
Langfang city 廊坊市; Lángfáng Shì (1310 / LFS)	Anci District	安次区	Āncì Qū	131002	ACI
Langfang city 廊坊市; Lángfáng Shì (1310 / LFS)	Guangyang District	广阳区	Guǎngyáng Qū	131003	GYQ
Langfang city 廊坊市; Lángfáng Shì (1310 / LFS)	Gu'an County	固安县	Gù'ān Xiàn	131022	GUA
Langfang city 廊坊市; Lángfáng Shì (1310 / LFS)	Yongqing County	永清县	Yǒngqīng Xiàn	131023	YQG
Langfang city 廊坊市; Lángfáng Shì (1310 / LFS)	Xianghe County	香河县	Xiānghé Xiàn	131024	XGH
Langfang city 廊坊市; Lángfáng Shì (1310 / LFS)	Daicheng County	大城县	Dàichéng Xiàn (Note: not Dàichéng)	131025	DCJ
Langfang city 廊坊市; Lángfáng Shì (1310 / LFS)	Wen'an County	文安县	Wén'ān Xiàn	131026	WEA
Langfang city 廊坊市; Lángfáng Shì (1310 / LFS)	Dachang County (Note: Conventional name: Dachang Hui Autonomous County; Chinese: 大厂回族自治县; pinyin: Dàchǎng Huízú Zìzhìxiàn)	大厂县	Dàchǎng Xiàn	131028	DCG
Langfang city 廊坊市; Lángfáng Shì (1310 / LFS)	Bazhou city	霸州市	Bàzhōu Shì	131081	BZO
Langfang city 廊坊市; Lángfáng Shì (1310 / LFS)	Sanhe city	三河市	Sānhé Shì	131082	SNH
Hengshui city 衡水市; Héngshuǐ Shì (1311 / HGS)	Taocheng District	桃城区	Táochéng Qū	131102	TOC
Hengshui city 衡水市; Héngshuǐ Shì (1311 / HGS)	Jizhou District	冀州区	Jìzhōu Qū	131103	JZA
Hengshui city 衡水市; Héngshuǐ Shì (1311 / HGS)	Zaoqiang County	枣强县	Zǎoqiáng Xiàn	131121	ZQJ
Hengshui city 衡水市; Héngshuǐ Shì (1311 / HGS)	Wuyi County	武邑县	Wǔyì Xiàn	131122	WYI
Hengshui city 衡水市; Héngshuǐ Shì (1311 / HGS)	Wuqiang County	武强县	Wǔqiáng Xiàn	131123	WQG
Hengshui city 衡水市; Héngshuǐ Shì (1311 / HGS)	Raoyang County	饶阳县	Ráoyáng Xiàn	131124	RYG
Hengshui city 衡水市; Héngshuǐ Shì (1311 / HGS)	Anping County	安平县	Ānpíng Xiàn	131125	APG
Hengshui city 衡水市; Héngshuǐ Shì (1311 / HGS)	Gucheng County	故城县	Gùchéng Xiàn	131126	GCE
Hengshui city 衡水市; Héngshuǐ Shì (1311 / HGS)	Jingxian County	景县	Jǐngxiàn	131127	JIG
Hengshui city 衡水市; Héngshuǐ Shì (1311 / HGS)	Fucheng County	阜城县	Fùchéng Xiàn	131128	FCE
Hengshui city 衡水市; Héngshuǐ Shì (1311 / HGS)	Shenzhou city	深州市	Shēnzhōu Shì	131182	SNZ

== Recent changes in administrative divisions ==
Date	Before	After	Note	Reference
1973-07-07	parts of Hebei Province	Tianjin Municipality	provincial transferred	
1973-07-07	parts of Tianjin Prefecture	provincial-controlled	transferred	
1973-07-07	↳ Ninghe County	↳ Ninghe County	transferred	
1973-07-07	↳ Jinghai County	↳ Jinghai County	transferred	
1973-07-07	↳ Wuqing County	↳ Wuqing County	transferred	
1973-07-07	↳ Baodi County	↳ Baodi County	transferred	
1973-07-07	↳ Ji County	↳ Ji County	transferred	
1973-12-02	Tianjin Prefecture	Langfang Prefecture	renamed	
1974-06-09	◎ Chengjiao District	◎ Shi District, Handan	disestablished & established	
1974-06-09	◎ Chengjiao District	◎ Jiao District, Handan	disestablished & established	
1976-07-11	◎ parts of Beidaihe District	◎ Jiao District, Qinhuangdao	established	
1978-03-11	parts of Shijiazhuang Prefecture	Shijiazhuang (P-City)	established	
1978-03-11	Shijiazhuang (PC-City)	Shijiazhuang (P-City)	disestablished	
1978-03-11	◎ Hongwei District	↳ Hongwei District	transferred	
1978-03-11	◎ Xinhua District, Shijiazhuang	↳ Xinhua District, Shijiazhuang	transferred	
1978-03-11	◎ Qiaodong District, Shijiazhuang	↳ Qiaodong District, Shijiazhuang	transferred	
1978-03-11	◎ Dongfanghong District	↳ Dongfanghong District	transferred	
1978-03-11	◎ Jiao District, Shijiazhuang	↳ Jiao District, Shijiazhuang	transferred	
1978-03-11	◎ Jingxing Kuang District	↳ Jingxing Kuang District	transferred	
1978-03-11	parts of Tangshan Prefecture	Tangshan (P-City)	established	
1978-03-11	Tangshan (PC-City)	Tangshan (P-City)	disestablished	
1978-03-11	◎ Lunan District	↳ Lunan District	transferred	
1978-03-11	◎ Lubei District	↳ Lubei District	transferred	
1978-03-11	◎ Jiao District, Tangshan	↳ Jiao District, Tangshan	transferred	
1978-03-11	◎ Dongkuang District	↳ Dongkuang District	transferred	
1979-05-04	parts of Jiao District, Tangshan	Lailuan Gongnong New Area	established	
1979-05-04	parts of Dongkuang District	Lailuan Gongnong New Area	established	
1980-02-04	Lailuan Gongnong New Area	Jiao District, Tangshan	disestablished & merged into	
1980-02-04	Lailuan Gongnong New Area	Dongkuang District	disestablished & merged into	
1980-03-06	Cangzhou (PC-City)	◎ Yunhe District	established	
1980-03-06	Cangzhou (PC-City)	◎ Xinhua District, Cangzhou	established	
1980-03-06	Cangzhou (PC-City)	◎ Jiao District, Cangzhou	established	
1980-03-06	Xingtai (PC-City)	◎ Qiaodong District, Xingtai	established	
1980-03-06	Xingtai (PC-City)	◎ Qiaoxi District, Xingtai	established	
1980-03-06	Xingtai (PC-City)	◎ Jiao District, Xingtai	established	
1980-05-12	Hongwei District, Shijiazhuang	Qiaoxi District, Shijiazhuang	renamed	
1980-05-12	Dongfanghong District, Shijiazhuang	Chang'an District	renamed	
1980-06-25	◎ Hongqiao District	◎ Shuangqiao District	disestablished & established	
1980-06-25	◎ Cuiqiao District	◎ Shuangqiao District	disestablished & established	
1980-06-25	◎ Cuiqiao District	◎ Shuangluan District	established	
1980-06-25	◎ parts of Hongqiao District	◎ Shuangluan District	established	
1980-07-22	◎ Shi District, Handan	◎ Hanshan District	disestablished & established	
1980-07-22	◎ Shi District, Handan	◎ Congtai District	disestablished & established	
1980-07-22	◎ Shi District, Handan	◎ Fuxing District	disestablished & established	
1980-08-27	parts of Jiao District, Tangshan	Xin District, Tangshan	established	
1980-08-27	Dongjiao District	Xin District, Tangshan	established	
1981-12-07	parts of Anci County	Langfang (PC-City)	established	
1982-01-30	parts of Hengshui County	Hengshui (PC-City)	established	
1982-03-17	Jiao District, Tangshan	Kaiping District	renamed	
1982-09-22	Gebozhuang Agriculture District	Tanghai County	reorganized	
1982-12-13	parts of Jiaohe County	Botou (PC-City)	established	
1982-12-13	parts of Nanpi County	Botou (PC-City)	established	
1983-01-18	all Province-controlled city (P-City) → Prefecture-level city (PL-City)			Civil Affairs Announcement
1983-01-18	all Prefecture-controlled city (PC-City) → County-level city (CL-City)			Civil Affairs Announcement
1983-03-03	Tangshan Prefecture	Tangshan (PL-City)	merged into	
1983-03-03	parts of Tangshan Prefecture	Qinhuangdao (PL-City)	established	
1983-03-03	↳ Qinhuangdao (CL-City)	Qinhuangdao (PL-City)	disestablished	
1983-03-03	◎ Haigang District	↳ Haigang District	transferred	
1983-03-03	◎ Shanhaiguan District	↳ Shanhaiguan District	transferred	
1983-03-03	◎ Beidaihe District	↳ Beidaihe District	transferred	
1983-03-03	◎ Jiao District, Qinhuangdao	↳ Jiao District, Qinhuangdao	transferred	
1983-03-03	↳ Funing County	↳ Funing County	transferred	
1983-03-03	↳ Changli County	↳ Changli County	transferred	
1983-03-03	↳ Lulong County	↳ Lulong County	transferred	
1983-03-03	↳ Laoting County	↳ Laoting County	transferred	
1983-03-03	parts of Chengde Prefecture	Qinhuangdao (PL-City)	transferred	
1983-03-03	↳ Qinglong County	↳ Qinglong County	transferred	
1983-03-03	Anci County	Langfang (CL-City)	merged into	
1983-03-03	Hengshui County	Hengshui (CL-City)	merged into	
1983-05-05	Jiaohe County	Botou (CL-City)	merged into	
1983-05-05	parts of Shijiazhuang Prefecture	Shijiazhuang (PL-City)	transferred	
1983-05-05	↳ Jingxing County	↳ Jingxing County	transferred	
1983-05-05	↳ Huolu County	↳ Huolu County	transferred	
1983-05-05	parts of Qinhuangdao (PL-City)	Tangshan (PL-City)	transferred	
1983-05-05	↳ Laoting County	↳ Laoting County	transferred	
1983-11-15	parts of Handan Prefecture	Handan (PL-City)	established	
1983-11-15	↳ Handan (CL-City)	Handan (PL-City)	disestablished	
1983-11-15	◎ Hanshan District	↳ Hanshan District	transferred	
1983-11-15	◎ Congtai District	↳ Congtai District	transferred	
1983-11-15	◎ Fuxing District	↳ Fuxing District	transferred	
1983-11-15	◎ Jiao District, Handan	↳ Jiao District, Handan	transferred	
1983-11-15	◎ Fengfeng Kuang District	↳ Fengfeng Kuang District	transferred	
1983-11-15	↳ Handan County	↳ Handan County	transferred	
1983-11-15	parts of Baoding Prefecture	Baoding (PL-City)	established	
1983-11-15	↳ Baoding (CL-City)	Baoding (PL-City)	disestablished	
1983-11-15	◎ Nanshi District	↳ Nanshi District	transferred	
1983-11-15	◎ Beishi District	↳ Beishi District	transferred	
1983-11-15	◎ Xinshi District	↳ Xinshi District	transferred	
1983-11-15	◎ Jiao District, Baoding	↳ Jiao District, Baoding	transferred	
1983-11-15	↳ Mancheng County	↳ Mancheng County	transferred	
1983-11-15	parts of Zhangjiakou Prefecture	Zhangjiakou (PL-City)	established	
1983-11-15	↳ Zhangjiakou (CL-City)	Zhangjiakou (PL-City)	disestablished	
1983-11-15	◎ Xuanhua District	↳ Xuanhua District	transferred	
1983-11-15	◎ Qiaodong District, Zhangjiakou	↳ Qiaodong District, Zhangjiakou	transferred	
1983-11-15	◎ Qiaoxi District, Zhangjiakou	↳ Qiaoxi District, Zhangjiakou	transferred	
1983-11-15	◎ Chafang District	↳ Chafang District	transferred	
1983-11-15	◎ Huayuan District	↳ Huayuan District	transferred	
1983-11-15	◎ Pangjiabao District	↳ Pangjiabao District	transferred	
1983-11-15	↳ Xuanhua County	↳ Xuanhua County	transferred	
1983-11-15	parts of Chengde Prefecture	Chengde (PL-City)	established	
1983-11-15	↳ Chengde (CL-City)	Chengde (PL-City)	disestablished	
1983-11-15	◎ Shuangqiao District	↳ Shuangqiao District	transferred	
1983-11-15	◎ Shuangluan District	↳ Shuangluan District	transferred	
1983-11-15	◎ Yingshouyingzi District	↳ Yingshouyingzi District	transferred	
1983-11-15	↳ Chengde County	↳ Chengde County	transferred	
1983-11-15	parts of Cangzhou Prefecture	Cangzhou (PL-City)	established	
1983-11-15	↳ Cangzhou (CL-City)	Cangzhou (PL-City)	disestablished	
1983-11-15	◎ Xinhua District, Cangzhou	↳ Xinhua District, Cangzhou	transferred	
1983-11-15	◎ Yunhe District	↳ Yunhe District	transferred	
1983-11-15	◎ Jiao District, Cangzhou	↳ Jiao District, Cangzhou	transferred	
1983-11-15	↳ Cangzhou County	↳ Cangzhou County	transferred	
1984-05-26	Jiao District, Qinhuangdao	Haigang District	merged into	
1984-05-26	Jiao District, Qinhuangdao	Shanhaiguan District	merged into	
1984-05-26	Jiao District, Qinhuangdao	Beidaihe District	merged into	
1986-03-05	Ding County	Dingzhou (CL-City)	reorganized	
1986-03-05	Shulu County	Xinji (CL-City)	reorganized	
1986-03-05	Nangong County	Nangong (CL-City)	reorganized	
1986-03-05	Renqiu County	Renqiu (CL-City)	reorganized	
1986-04-05	parts of Shijiazhuang Prefecture	Shijiazhuang (PL-City)	transferred	
1986-04-05	↳ Zhengding County	↳ Zhengding County	transferred	
1986-04-05	↳ Luancheng County	↳ Luancheng County	transferred	
1986-04-05	parts of Handan Prefecture	Handan (PL-City)	transferred	
1986-04-05	↳ Wu'an County	↳ Wu'an County	transferred	
1986-04-05	Jiao District, Handan	Hanshan District	merged into	
1986-04-05	Jiao District, Handan	Congtai District	merged into	
1986-04-05	Jiao District, Handan	Fuxing District	merged into	
1986-04-05	parts of Baoding Prefecture	Baoding (PL-City)	transferred	
1986-04-05	↳ Qingyuan County	↳ Qingyuan County	transferred	
1986-04-05	parts of Cangzhou Prefecture	Cangzhou (PL-City)	transferred	
1986-04-05	↳ Qing County	↳ Qing County	transferred	
1986-04-05	parts of Xingtai Prefecture	Xingtai (PL-City)	transferred	
1986-04-05	↳ Xingtai County	↳ Xingtai County	transferred	
1986-09-24	Zhuo County	Zhuozhou (CL-City)	reorganized	
1986-12-02	Qinglong County	Qinglong County (Aut.)	reorganized	
1986-12-02	Fengning County	Fengning County (Aut.)	reorganized	
1987-02-20	Shahe County	Shahe (CL-City)	reorganized	
1987-10-15	Jiao District, Baoding	Beishi District	merged into	
1987-10-15	Jiao District, Baoding	Nanshi District	merged into	
1987-10-15	Jiao District, Baoding	Xinshi District	merged into	
1988-09-13	Langfang Prefecture	Langfang (PL-City)	reorganized	
1988-09-13	Langfang (CL-City)	Anci District	reorganized	
1988-09-01	Wu'an County	Wu'an (CL-City)	reorganized	
1988-09-17	Jiao District, Xingtai	Qiaodong District, Xingtai	merged into	
1988-09-17	Jiao District, Xingtai	Qiaoxi District, Xingtai	merged into	
1989-06-29	Kuancheng County	Kuancheng County (Aut.)	reorganized	
1989-06-29	Weichang County	Weichang County (Aut.)	reorganized	
1989-07-27	Huanghua County	Huanghua (CL-City)	reorganized	
1989-07-27	Gaocheng County	Gaocheng (CL-City)	reorganized	
1989-12-08	Jingxing Kuang District	Jingxing County	merged into	
1989-12-20	Chafang District	Qiaodong District, Zhangjiakou	merged into	
1989-12-20	Chafang District	Qiaoxi District, Zhangjiakou	merged into	
1989-12-20	Pangjiabao District	Xuanhua County	merged into	
1990-01-04	Ba County	Bazhou (CL-City)	reorganized	
1990-10-18	Hejian County	Hejian (CL-City)	reorganized	
1991-05-06	Anguo County	Anguo (CL-City)	reorganized	Civil Affairs [1991]8
1991-11-30	Jin County	Jinzhou (CL-City)	reorganized	Civil Affairs [1991]76
1992-02-17	Zunhua County	Zunhua (CL-City)	reorganized	Civil Affairs [1992]17
1992-05-30	parts of Jingxing County	Jingxing Kuang District	reorganized	Civil Affairs [1992]57
1992-10-08	Xinle County	Xinle (CL-City)	reorganized	Civil Affairs [1992]111
1993-03-03	Sanhe County	Sanhe (CL-City)	reorganized	
1993-04-09	Xincheng County	Gaobeidian (CL-City)	reorganized	Civil Affairs [1993]76
1993-05-20	Jiangwan County	Shunping County	renamed	Civil Affairs [1993]110
1993-06-19	Shijiazhuang Prefecture	Shijiazhuang (PL-City)	merged into	State Council [1993]89
1993-06-19	Zhangjiakou Prefecture	Zhangjiakou (PL-City)	merged into	State Council [1993]89
1993-06-19	Cangzhou Prefecture	Cangzhou (PL-City)	merged into	State Council [1993]89
1993-06-19	Handan Prefecture	Handan (PL-City)	merged into	State Council [1993]89
1993-06-19	Xingtai Prefecture	Xingtai (PL-City)	merged into	State Council [1993]89
1993-06-19	Chengde Prefecture	Zhangjiakou (PL-City)	merged into	State Council [1993]89
1993-09-22	Ji County	Jizhou (CL-City)	reorganized	Civil Affairs [1993]185
1994-04-05	Fengnan County	Fengnan (CL-City)	reorganized	Civil Affairs [1994]49
1994-05-18	Huolu County	Luquan (CL-City)	reorganized	
1994-07-04	Shen County	Shenzhou (CL-City)	reorganized	Civil Affairs [1994]96
1994-12-17	Baoding Prefecture	Baoding (PL-City)	merged into	State Council [1994]133
1995-01-11	Dongkuang District	Guye District	renamed	Civil Affairs [1995]1
1996-05-31	Hengshui Prefecture	Hengshui (PL-City)	reorganized	State Council [1996]39
1996-05-31	Hengshui (CL-City)	Taocheng District	reorganized	State Council [1996]39
1996-10-10	Qiu County (丘县)	Qiu County (邱县)	renamed	Civil Affairs [1996]74
1996-10-10	Qian'an County	Qian'an (CL-City)	reorganized	Civil Affairs [1996]75
1997-10-21	Jiao District, Cangzhou	Xinhua District, Cangzhou	disestablished & merged into	State Council [1997]96
1997-10-21	Jiao District, Cangzhou	Yunhe District	disestablished & merged into	State Council [1997]96
2000-03-07	parts of Guangyang District	Anci District	transferred	State Council [2000]19
2001-01-22	Jiao District, Shijiazhuang	Yuhua District	reorganized	State Council [2001]10
2002-02-01	Fengnan (CL-City)	Fengnan District	reorganized	State Council [2002]7
2002-02-01	Fengrun County	Fengrun District	reorganized	State Council [2002]7
2002-02-01	Xin District	Fengrun District	merged into	State Council [2002]7
2012-07-11	Tanghai County	Caofeidian District	reorganized	State Council [2012]85
2014-09-09	Qiaodong District, Shijiazhuang	Chang'an District	disestablished & merged into	State Council [2014]122
2014-09-09	Qiaodong District, Shijiazhuang	Qiaoxi District, Shijiazhuang	disestablished & merged into	State Council [2014]122
2014-09-09	Gaocheng (CL-City)	Gaocheng District	reorganized	State Council [2014]122
2014-09-09	Luquan (CL-City)	Luquan District	reorganized	State Council [2014]122
2014-09-09	Luancheng County	Luancheng District	reorganized	State Council [2014]122
2015-04-29	Xinshi District	Jingxiu District	renamed	State Council [2015]73
2015-04-29	Beishi District	Lianchi District	merged into	State Council [2015]73
2015-04-29	Nanshi District	Lianchi District	merged into	State Council [2015]73
2015-04-29	Mancheng County	Mancheng District	reorganized	State Council [2015]73
2015-04-29	Qingyuan County	Qingyuan District	reorganized	State Council [2015]73
2015-04-29	Xushui County	Xushui District	reorganized	State Council [2015]73
2015-07-23	Funing County	Funing District	reorganized	State Council [2015]121
2016-01-07	Xuanhua County	Xuanhua District	merged into	State Council [2016]5
2016-01-07	Wanquan County	Wanquan District	reorganized	State Council [2016]5
2016-01-07	Chongli County	Chongli District	reorganized	State Council [2016]5
2016-06-08	Jizhou (CL-City)	Jizhou District	reorganized	State Council [2016]103
2016-09-14	Handan County	Hanshan District	merged into	State Council [2016]157
2016-09-14	Handan County	Congtai District	merged into	State Council [2016]157
2016-09-14	parts of Ci County	Hanshan District	transferred	State Council [2016]157
2016-09-14	parts of Ci County	Congtai District	transferred	State Council [2016]157
2016-09-14	parts of Ci County	Fuxing District	transferred	State Council [2016]157
2016-09-14	Feixiang County	Feixiang District	reorganized	State Council [2016]157
2016-09-14	Yongnian County	Yongnian District	reorganized	State Council [2016]157
2017-04-09	Pingquan County	Pingquan (CL-City)	reorganized	Civil Affairs [2017]67
2018-07-02	Luan County	Luanzhou (CL-City)	reorganized	Civil Affairs [2018]103
2020-06-??	Qiaoxi District	Xiangdu District	renamed	
2020-06-??	parts of Xingtai County	Xiangdu District	merged into	
2020-06-??	Qiaodong District	Xindu District	renamed	
2020-06-??	parts of Xingtai County	Xindu District	merged into	
2020-06-??	Qiaodong District	Xindu District	renamed	
2020-06-??	Ren County	Renze District	reorganized	
2020-06-??	Nanhe County	Nanhe District	reorganized	

== Population composition ==
=== Prefectures ===
Prefecture	2010	2000
Shijiazhuang	10,163,788	9,345,423
Baoding	11,194,379	10,589,200
Cangzhou	7,134,053	6,714,392
Chengde	3,473,197	3,361,616
Handan	9,174,679	8,481,414
Hengshui	4,340,773	4,203,801
Langfang	4,358,839	
Qinhuangdao	2,987,605	2,785,025
Tangshan	7,577,284	7,119,967
Xingtai	7,104,114	
Zhangjiakou	4,345,491	4,238,308

=== Counties ===
Name	Prefecture	2010
Chang'an	Shijiazhuang	479,801
Qiaoxi	Shijiazhuang	596,164
Xinhua	Shijiazhuang	625,119
Yuhua	Shijiazhuang	655,414
Jingxing(qu)	Shijiazhuang	95,170
Jingxing(xian)	Shijiazhuang	309,882
Zhengding	Shijiazhuang	466,807
Luancheng	Shijiazhuang	328,933
Xingtang	Shijiazhuang	406,353
Lingshou	Shijiazhuang	333,558
Gaoyi	Shijiazhuang	186,478
Shenze	Shijiazhuang	250,264
Zanhuang	Shijiazhuang	244,799
Wuji	Shijiazhuang	502,662
Pingshan	Shijiazhuang	433,429
Yuanshi	Shijiazhuang	418,466
Zhao(xian)	Shijiazhuang	571,077
Xinji	Shijiazhuang	615,919
Gaocheng	Shijiazhuang	775,110
Jinzhou	Shijiazhuang	537,679
Xinle	Shijiazhuang	487,652
Luquan	Shijiazhuang	432,936
Lunan	Tangshan	311,076
Lubei	Tangshan	743,504
Guye	Tangshan	358,461
Kaiping	Tangshan	262,571
Fengnan	Tangshan	541,352
Fengrun	Tangshan	916,092
Tanghai → Caofeidian	Tangshan	251,785
Luan→Luanzhou	Tangshan	554315
Luannan	Tangshan	571,779
Laoting	Tangshan	526,222
Qianxi	Tangshan	390,128
Yutian	Tangshan	684,833
Zunhua	Tangshan	737,011
Qian'an	Tangshan	728,160
Haigang	Qinhuangdao	765,254
Shanhaiguan	Qinhuangdao	178,769
Beidaihe	Qinhuangdao	85,647
Qinglong	Qinhuangdao	496,726
Changli	Qinhuangdao	559,697
Funing	Qinhuangdao	517,073
Lulong	Qinhuangdao	384,439
Hanshan	Handan	385,626
Congtai	Handan	363,778
Fuxing	Handan	192,023
Fengfeng	Handan	503,911
Feixiang	Handan	351,690
Yongnian	Handan	943,935
Linzhang	Handan	600,600
Cheng'an	Handan	377,398
Daming	Handan	767,035
She(xian)	Handan	413,057
Ci(xian)	Handan	677,884
Qiu(xian)	Handan	227,578
Jize	Handan	274,328
Guangping	Handan	268,993
Guantao	Handan	309,032
Wei(xian)	Handan	809,193
Quzhou	Handan	427,610
Wu'an	Handan	819,000
Xiangdu	Xingtai	269,603
Xindu	Xingtai	400,551
Lincheng	Xingtai	204,086
Neiqiu	Xingtai	266,620
Baixiang	Xingtai	190,225
Longyao	Xingtai	506,552
Renze	Xingtai	327,926
Nanhe	Xingtai	325,332
Ningjin	Xingtai	764,828
Julu	Xingtai	374,634
Xinhe	Xingtai	169,858
Guangzong	Xingtai	283,851
Pingxiang	Xingtai	300,029
Wei(xian)	Xingtai	556,624
Qinghe	Xingtai	386,231
Linxi	Xingtai	343,384
Nangong	Xingtai	469,030
Shahe	Xingtai	498,416
Xinshi	Baoding	482,768
Beishi	Baoding	387,339
Nanshi	Baoding	287,784
Mancheng	Baoding	387,307
Qingyuan	Baoding	631,659
Laishui	Baoding	339,063
Fuping	Baoding	295,764
Xushui	Baoding	563,030
Dingxing	Baoding	517,873
Tang(xian)	Baoding	529,066
Gaoyang	Baoding	345,160
Rongcheng	Baoding	258,179
Laiyuan	Baoding	260,678
Wangdu	Baoding	250,014
Anxin	Baoding	437,378
Yi(xian)	Baoding	537,564
Quyang	Baoding	588,559
Li(xian)	Baoding	505,574
Shunping	Baoding	295,764
Boye	Baoding	245,504
Xiong(xian)	Baoding	359,506
Zhuozhou	Baoding	603,535
Dingzhou	Baoding	1,165,182
Anguo	Baoding	370,314
Gaobeidian	Baoding	640,280
Qiaodong	Zhangjiakou	339,372
Qiaoxi	Zhangjiakou	287,900
Xuanhua(qu)	Zhangjiakou	370,569
Xiahuayuan	Zhangjiakou	62,764
Zhangbei	Zhangjiakou	318,669
Kangbao	Zhangjiakou	204,975
Guyuan	Zhangjiakou	174,619
Shangyi	Zhangjiakou	151,398
Yu(xian)	Zhangjiakou	450,236
Yangyuan	Zhangjiakou	258,086
Huai'an	Zhangjiakou	210,914
Wanquan	Zhangjiakou	211,706
Huailai	Zhangjiakou	352,307
Zhuolu	Zhangjiakou	333,932
Chicheng	Zhangjiakou	238,169
Chongli	Zhangjiakou	106,122
Shuangqiao	Chengde	424,897
Shuangluan	Chengde	146,878
Yingshouyingzi	Chengde	62,454
Chengde	Chengde	388,554
Xinglong	Chengde	314,730
Pingquan	Chengde	446,939
Luanping	Chengde	287,986
Longhua	Chengde	372,030
Fengning	Chengde	357,029
Kuancheng	Chengde	250,304
Weichang	Chengde	421,400
Xinhua	Cangzhou	228,340
Yunhe	Cangzhou	308,453
Cang(xian)	Cangzhou	669,019
Qing(xian)	Cangzhou	402,137
Dongguang	Cangzhou	356,501
Haixing	Cangzhou	201,538
Yanshan	Cangzhou	436,811
Suning	Cangzhou	334,639
Nanpi	Cangzhou	366,231
Wuqiao	Cangzhou	282,410
Xian(xian)	Cangzhou	579,830
Mengcun	Cangzhou	202,571
Botou	Cangzhou	584,308
Renqiu	Cangzhou	822,454
Huanghua	Cangzhou	548,506
Hejian	Cangzhou	810,305
Anci	Langfang	367,670
Guangyang	Langfang	500,396
Gu'an	Langfang	418,689
Yongqing	Langfang	356,481
Xianghe	Langfang	343,372
Dacheng	Langfang	477,773
Wen'an	Langfang	500,967
Dachang	Langfang	118,474
Bazhou	Langfang	622,975
Sanhe	Langfang	652,042
Taocheng	Hengshui	522,147
Zaoqiang	Hengshui	394,469
Wuyi	Hengshui	315,693
Wuqiang	Hengshui	214,549
Raoyang	Hengshui	280,498
Anping	Hengshui	328,512
Gucheng	Hengshui	487,025
Jing(xian)	Hengshui	528,693
Fucheng	Hengshui	341,087
Jizhou	Hengshui	362,013
Shenzhou	Hengshui	566,087
Qiaodong (disestablished)	Shijiazhuang	410,116
Xuanhua(xian) (disestablished)	Zhangjiakou	273,506
Handan (disestablished)	Handan	462,012
Xingtai (disestablished)	Xingtai	466,323

== Drafted and proposed cities ==
Hebei is planning to re-organise the administrative divisions with an addition of three new prefecture-level cities, all to be located adjacent to Beijing and named in regard to their position with respect to the national capital:

- Jingbei (京北市, meaning "North of Capital") will be carved from two counties in Zhangjiakou: Huailai and Zhuolu
- Jingnan (京南市, meaning "South of Capital") will compose of a county-level city in Baoding: Zhuozhou
- Jingdong (京东市 meaning "East of Capital") will consist of three county-level administrative divisions in today's Langfang: Sanhe, Xianghe, and Dachang (Hui). They currently comprise the exclave situated between Beijing and Tianjin.
