= Kangbao =

Kangbao may refer to:

- Kangbao County, in Hebei, China
- Kangbao Town, county seat of Kangbao County
