= DXG =

DXG can refer to:

- Kindle DX Graphite, a type of Amazon Kindle device sold from 2010 to 2013
- Dharangaon railway station, a train station in Dharangaon, Maharashtra, India
- dxg, a click consonant in the Juǀʼhoan language of Namibia and Botswana
- Miscellaneous far left, a classification of political parties in the 2022 French legislative election
- Dat Xanh, a company which Vietnam Enterprise Investments invests in, by stock ticker
- Dioxolane guanine, a molecule produced from amdoxovir; see Discovery and development of nucleoside and nucleotide reverse-transcriptase inhibitors
- Dingxing County, a county in Baoding city, Hebei province, China; see List of administrative divisions of Hebei
