= Han Weiji =

Han Weiji (simplified Chinese: 韩维基; traditional Chinese: 韓維基; pinyin: Hán Wéijī), courtesy name Zhenzi (simplified Chinese: 贞子; traditional Chinese: 貞子; pinyin: Zhēnzǐ), was a Chinese official who lived in the Qing dynasty. Han was born in Xiaotian Village, Zichuan County, Jinan Prefecture, Shandong Province, China (now Fujia Town, Zhangdian District, Zibo Prefecture). Han was a tong jinshi who obtained the third highest position in his class in the imperial examination. During the reign of the Kangxi Emperor, Han served as a county magistrate in Wenxi County, Shanxi and Boye County, Zhili.

== Life ==
Han Weiji was the grandson of Han Maocai and the son of Han Guangzhai. Han Weiji was a juren (lit. "presented scholar") in 1660, and ranked 146th in the imperial examination in 1664. He was appointed as the magistrate of Wenxi County, Shanxi in 1674, and then took office in Boye County, Zhili in 1681. He punished criminals severely in larceny cases, which led to a fall in crime rates in his jurisdictions.
