= Gaoshanbao Township =

Gaoshanbao Township 高山堡乡
- Rural Township
- Gāoshānbăo Xiāng
- Location in Hebei Location in China
- Coordinates: 41°44′05″N 115°32′21″E
- Country: People's Republic of China
- Province: Hebei
- Prefecture-level city: Zhangjiakou
- County: Guyuan

Area
  - Total: 188.8 km^{2} (72.9 sq mi)

Population (2010)
  - Total: 6,322
  - Density: 33.49/km^{2} (86.7/sq mi)
- Time zone: UTC+8 (China Standard)

Gaoshanbao Township (Chinese: 高山堡乡; pinyin: Gāoshānbăo Xiāng) is a rural township located in Guyuan County, Zhangjiakou, Hebei, China. According to the 2010 census, Gaoshanbao Township had a population of 6,322, including 3,313 males and 3,009 females. The population was distributed as follows: 875 people aged under 14, 4,734 people aged between 15 and 64, and 713 people aged over 65.

== See also ==
- List of township-level divisions of Hebei
