= Changshanyu =

Changshanyu 长山峪镇
- Town
- Chángshānyù Zhèn
- Location in Hebei Location in China
- Coordinates: 40°51′01″N 117°25′10″E
- Country: People's Republic of China
- Province: Hebei
- Prefecture-level city: Chengde
- County: Luanping

Area
  - Total: 198.6 km^{2} (76.7 sq mi)

Population (2010)
  - Total: 20,024
  - Density: 100.8/km^{2} (261/sq mi)
- Time zone: UTC+8 (China Standard)

Changshanyu (Chinese: 长山峪镇; pinyin: Chángshānyù Zhèn) is a town located in Luanping County, Chengde, Hebei, China. According to the 2010 census, Changshanyu had a population of 20,024, including 10,339 males and 9,685 females. The population was distributed as follows: 3,684 people aged under 14, 14,342 people aged between 15 and 64, and 1,998 people aged over 65.

== See also ==
- List of township-level divisions of Hebei
