= Chenzhazi Township =

Chenzhazi Township 陈栅子乡
- Rural Township
- Chénzhàzi Xiāng
- Location in Hebei Location in China
- Coordinates: 40°53′06″N 117°47′39″E
- Country: People's Republic of China
- Province: Hebei
- Prefecture-level city: Chengde
- District: Shuangluan

Area
  - Total: 88.53 km^{2} (34.18 sq mi)

Population (2010)
  - Total: 12,119
  - Density: 136.9/km^{2} (355/sq mi)
- Time zone: UTC+8 (China Standard)

Chenzhazi Township (Chinese: 陈栅子乡; pinyin: Chénzhàzi Xiāng) is a rural township located in Shuangluan District, Chengde, Hebei, China. According to the 2010 census, Chenzhazi Township had a population of 12,119, including 6,316 males and 5,803 females. The population was distributed as follows: 2,310 people aged under 14, 8,744 people aged between 15 and 64, and 1,065 people aged over 65.

== See also ==
- List of township-level divisions of Hebei
