= Baisiying Township =

Baisiying Township 柏寺营乡
- Rural Township
- Bǎisìyíng Xiāng
- Location in Hebei Location in China
- Coordinates: 36°23′03″N 114°43′30″E
- Country: People's Republic of China
- Province: Hebei
- Prefecture-level city: Handan
- County: Cheng'an

Area
  - Total: 33.81 km^{2} (13.05 sq mi)

Population (2010)
  - Total: 21,368
  - Density: 632/km^{2} (1,640/sq mi)
- Time zone: UTC+8 (China Standard)

Baisiying Township (Chinese: 柏寺营乡; pinyin: Bǎisìyíng Xiāng) is a rural township located in Cheng'an County, Handan, Hebei, China. According to the 2010 census, Baisiying Township had a population of 21,368, including 10,249 males and 11,119 females. The population was distributed as follows: 5,120 people aged under 14, 14,436 people aged between 15 and 64, and 1,812 people aged over 65.

== See also ==
- List of township-level divisions of Hebei
