= Chuchangdi Township =

Chuchangdi Township 处长地乡
- Rural Township
- Chŭchángdì Xiāng
- Location in Hebei Location in China
- Coordinates: 41°45′08″N 114°26′53″E
- Country: People's Republic of China
- Province: Hebei
- Prefecture-level city: Zhangjiakou
- County: Kangbao

Area
  - Total: 161.0 km^{2} (62.2 sq mi)

Population (2010)
  - Total: 9,808
  - Density: 60.91/km^{2} (157.8/sq mi)
- Time zone: UTC+8 (China Standard)

Chuchangdi Township (Chinese: 处长地乡; pinyin: Chŭchángdì Xiāng) is a rural township located in Kangbao County, Zhangjiakou, Hebei, China. According to the 2010 census, Chuchangdi Township had a population of 9,808, including 4,957 males and 4,851 females. The population was distributed as follows: 1,457 people aged under 14, 7,270 people aged between 15 and 64, and 1,081 people aged over 65.

== See also ==
- List of township-level divisions of Hebei
