= Luanping County =

Luanping County 滦平县 Lwanping
- County
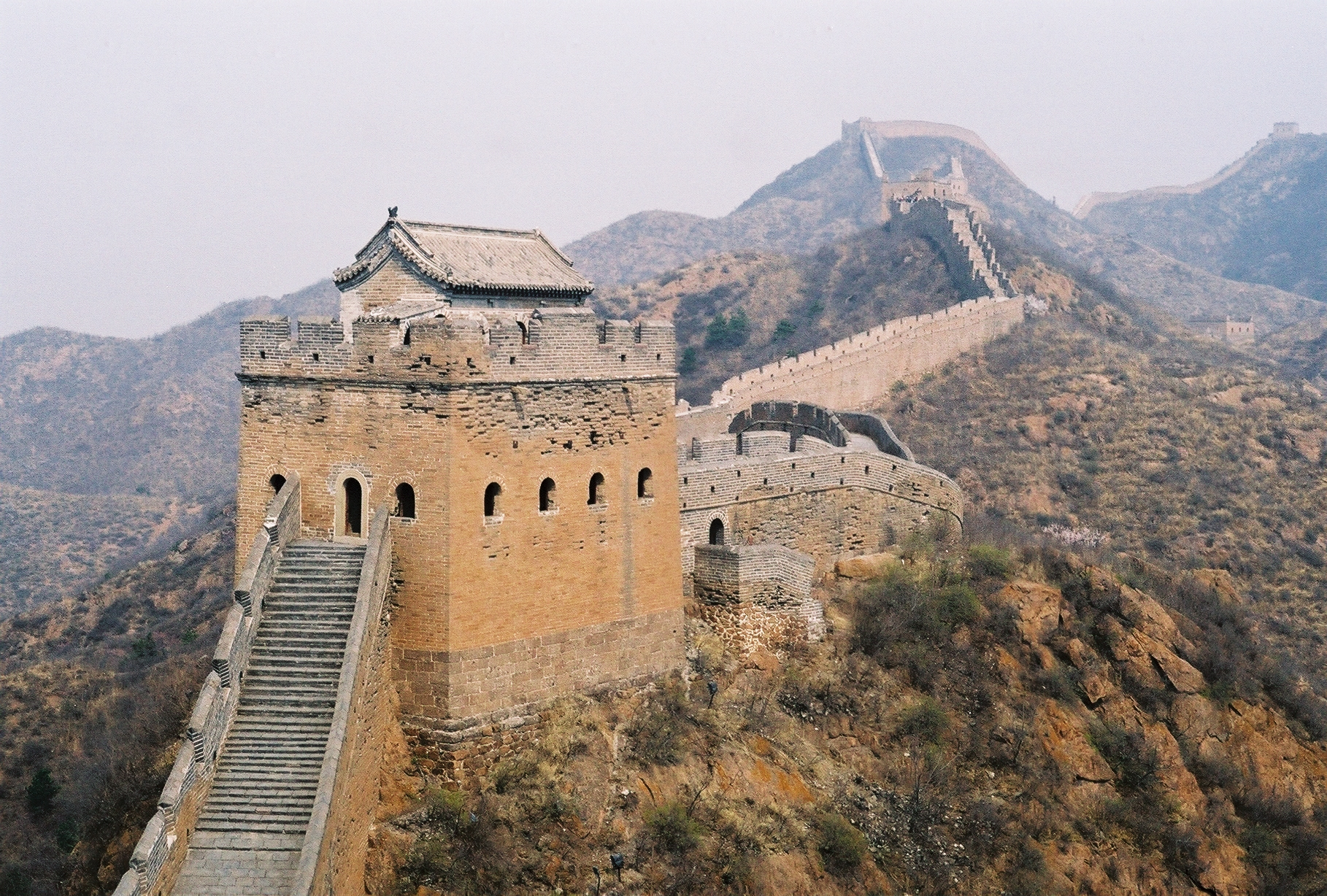
- Jinshanling Great Wall

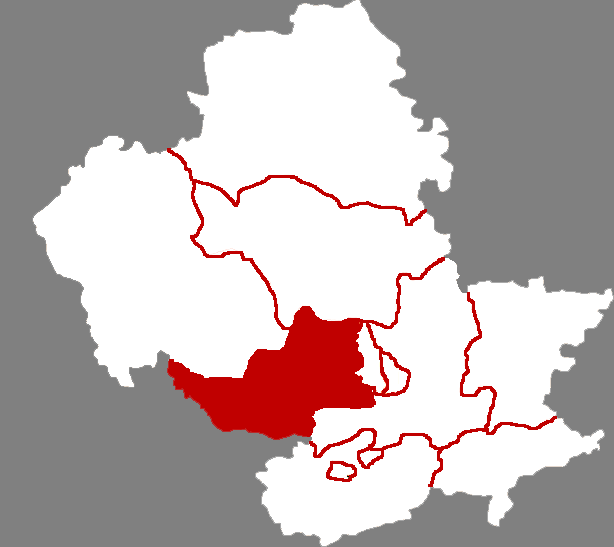
- Location in Chengde

- Location of the seat in Hebei
- Coordinates (Luanping County government): 40°56′30″N 117°19′57″E
- Country: People's Republic of China
- Province: Hebei
- Prefecture-level city: Chengde
- County seat: Luanping Town (滦平镇)

Area
  - Total: 3,195 km^{2} (1,234 sq mi)
- Elevation: 515 m (1,690 ft)

Population (2020)
  - Total: 268,647
  - Density: 84.08/km^{2} (217.8/sq mi)
- Time zone: UTC+8 (China Standard)
- Postal code: 068250
- Area code: 0314
- Website: LPX.gov.cn

Luanping County (simplified Chinese: 滦平县; traditional Chinese: 灤平縣; pinyin: Luánpíng Xiàn) is a county of northeastern Hebei Province, with the Great Wall of China demarcating its border with Miyun District, Beijing to the southwest. It is under the administration of Chengde City, and as of 2020, has a population of 268,647 residing in an area of 3,195 km^{2} (1,234 sq mi). The G45 Daqing–Guangzhou Expressway, China National Highways 101 and 112, and the Beijing–Tongliao Railway pass through the county. Other bordering county-level divisions are Fengning County to the northwest, Longhua County to the north, Chengde's core districts of Shuangqiao District and Shuangluan District to the east, and Chengde County to the southeast.

== Administrative divisions ==
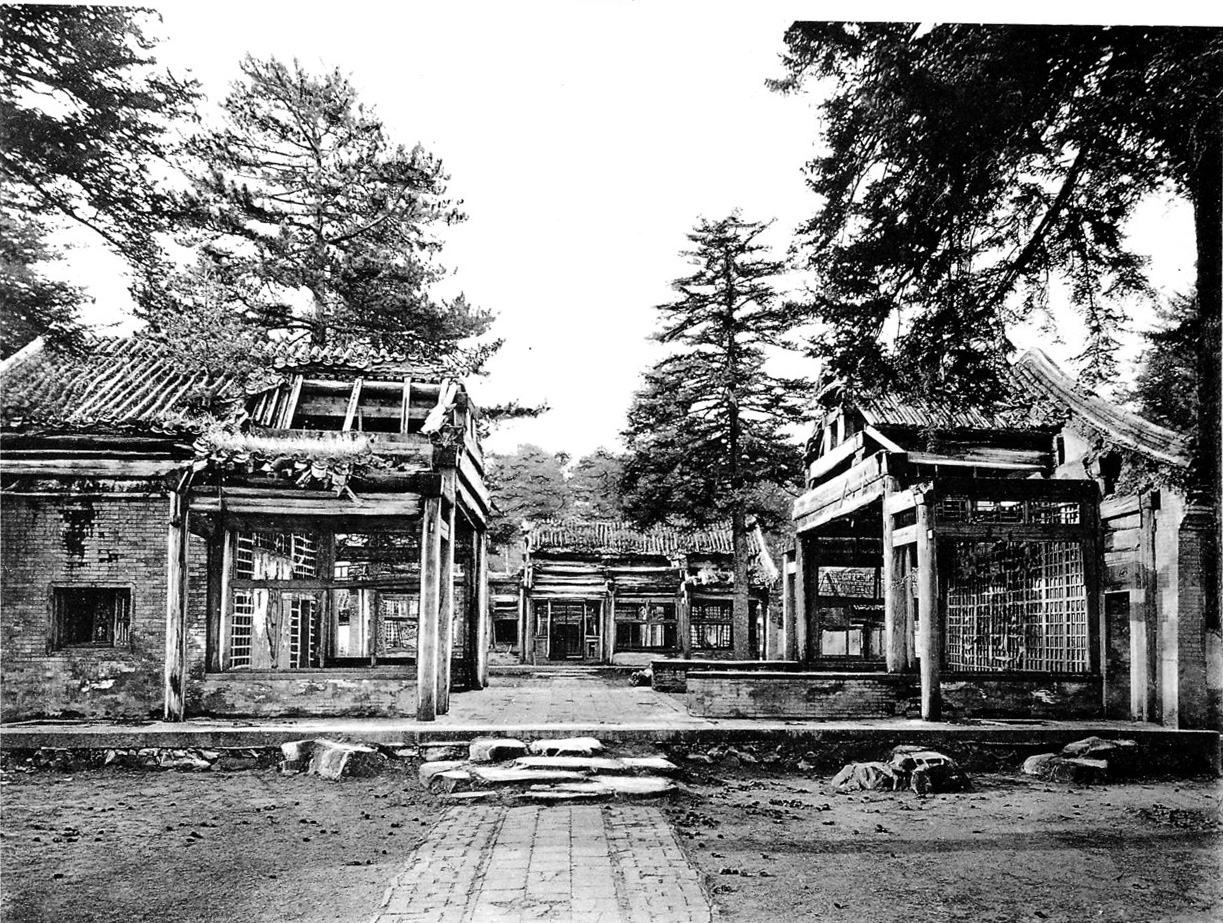
Palace ruins at Changshanyu, early 20th century.

The county administers 1 subdistrict, 10 towns, 2 townships, and 8 ethnic townships.

The county's only subdistrict is Zhongxing Road Subdistrict.

Towns:

- Luanping
- Changshanyu
- Hongqi
- Jingoutun
- Hushiha
- Bakeshiying
- Zhangbaiwan
- Fuyingzi
- Datun
- Huodoushan

Townships:

- Liangjianfang Township
- Laowa Township

Ethnic Townships:

- Pingfang Manchu Ethnic Township
- Anchungoumen Manchu Ethnic Township
- Xiaoying Manchu Ethnic Township
- Xigou Manchu Ethnic Township
- Dengchang Manchu Ethnic Township
- Wudaoyingzi Manchu Ethnic Township
- Mayingzi Manchu Ethnic Township
- Fujiadian Manchu Ethnic Township

== Climate ==
Climate data for Luanping, elevation 529 m (1,736 ft), (1991–2020 normals, extremes 1981–present)
Month	Jan	Feb	Mar	Apr	May	Jun	Jul	Aug	Sep	Oct	Nov	Dec	Year
Record high °C (°F)	10.8 (51.4)	17.6 (63.7)	25.4 (77.7)	31.5 (88.7)	37.2 (99.0)	37.4 (99.3)	38.0 (100.4)	37.2 (99.0)	35.6 (96.1)	29.2 (84.6)	19.9 (67.8)	14.4 (57.9)	38.0 (100.4)
Mean daily maximum °C (°F)	−1.8 (28.8)	2.4 (36.3)	9.5 (49.1)	17.9 (64.2)	24.3 (75.7)	27.9 (82.2)	29.2 (84.6)	28.2 (82.8)	23.6 (74.5)	16.3 (61.3)	6.6 (43.9)	−0.7 (30.7)	15.3 (59.5)
Daily mean °C (°F)	−10.0 (14.0)	−5.7 (21.7)	2.1 (35.8)	10.7 (51.3)	17.1 (62.8)	21.1 (70.0)	23.3 (73.9)	21.9 (71.4)	16.1 (61.0)	8.6 (47.5)	−0.7 (30.7)	−8.4 (16.9)	8.0 (46.4)
Mean daily minimum °C (°F)	−16.3 (2.7)	−12.3 (9.9)	−4.9 (23.2)	3.3 (37.9)	9.4 (48.9)	14.7 (58.5)	18.3 (64.9)	16.8 (62.2)	10.1 (50.2)	2.1 (35.8)	−6.5 (20.3)	−14.1 (6.6)	1.7 (35.1)
Record low °C (°F)	−28.2 (−18.8)	−25.3 (−13.5)	−21.8 (−7.2)	−9.0 (15.8)	−1.7 (28.9)	4.5 (40.1)	9.4 (48.9)	7.1 (44.8)	−1.3 (29.7)	−11.9 (10.6)	−22.7 (−8.9)	−27.9 (−18.2)	−28.2 (−18.8)
Average precipitation mm (inches)	2.0 (0.08)	4.2 (0.17)	11.2 (0.44)	23.6 (0.93)	55.3 (2.18)	80.7 (3.18)	143.2 (5.64)	104.0 (4.09)	52.3 (2.06)	33.5 (1.32)	12.8 (0.50)	3.0 (0.12)	525.8 (20.71)
Average precipitation days (≥ 0.1 mm)	2.1	2.4	3.6	5.0	8.4	12.9	14.5	12.1	9.0	5.5	3.4	2.2	81.1
Average snowy days	3.3	3.0	3.2	1.1	0.1	0	0	0	0	0.5	3.1	3.3	17.6
Average relative humidity (%)	53	48	43	43	49	63	75	77	72	63	59	56	58
Mean monthly sunshine hours	204.6	203.8	242.3	250.1	273.6	234.7	210.9	225.6	220.0	213.2	187.7	188.9	2,655.4
Percentage possible sunshine	68	67	65	62	61	52	46	53	60	63	64	66	61
Source: China Meteorological Administration

== History ==
In the early 15th century, the Yongle Emperor forced all residents of the Luanping area to move to within the city walls, leaving the countryside uninhabited. In the early Qing dynasty, the Kangxi Emperor ordered the now long uninhabited area to be redeveloped, with the new residents speaking a form of Mandarin Chinese that would become the predecessor of modern Standard Chinese. Simultaneously, Luanping became a stop for officials travelling between Beijing and the Chengde Mountain Resort, which contributed to residents speaking with the accent of government officials.

Standard Chinese is based on the accent of Luanping residents, who speak a variety of Beijing dialect. The accent of Luanping was chosen for its more "straightforward" pronunciation compared to that of urban Beijing; for example, Beijing uses more erhua, syllable coalescence and exhibits significant dialect mixing.
