= Guyuan County =

Guyuan County 沽源县
- County
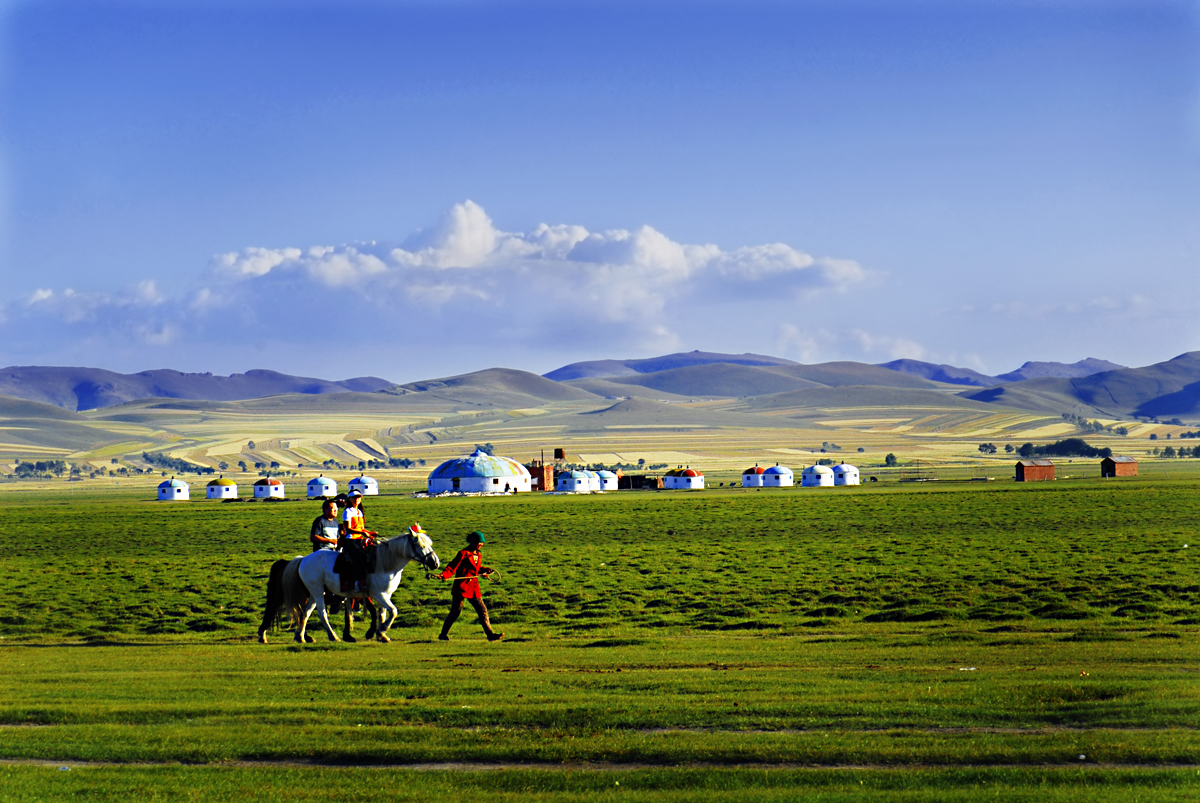

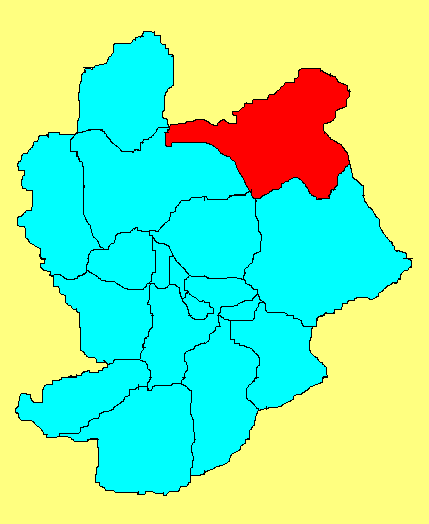
- Location in Zhangjiakou

- Location of the seat in Hebei
- Coordinates: 41°40′N 115°41′E
- Country: People's Republic of China
- Province: Hebei
- Prefecture-level city: Zhangjiakou

Area
  - Total: 3,585 km^{2} (1,384 sq mi)
- Highest elevation: 2,123 m (6,965 ft)
- Lowest elevation: 1,356 m (4,449 ft)

Population (2020 census)
  - Total: 167,587
  - Density: 46.75/km^{2} (121.1/sq mi)
- Time zone: UTC+8 (China Standard)
- Website: www.zjkgy.gov.cn

Guyuan County (simplified Chinese: 沽源县; traditional Chinese: 沽源縣; pinyin: Gūyuán Xiàn) is a county under the administration of Zhangjiakou, Hebei, People's Republic of China. It was once part of the province of Chahar, and now borders Inner Mongolia. The area of the city is 2,621 square kilometres (1,012 sq mi), and the population as of 2020 is 167,587. Bordering county-level divisions are Fengning Manchu Autonomous County to the east, Chicheng County and Chongli District to the south, Zhangbei and Kangbao counties to the west, and, in Inner Mongolia, Taibus Banner, Zhenglan Banner and Duolun County to the north. It is a primarily mountainous county in northern Hebei, and thus has a cold climate with long, bitter winters and mild summers.

== Administration ==
There are 4 towns (镇), 9 townships (乡), and 1 ethnic township (民族乡)

Towns:

- Pingdingbu (平定堡镇), Xiaochang (小厂镇), Huangshandiao (黄盖淖镇), Jiuliancheng (九连城镇)

Townships:

- Gaoshanbao Township (高山堡乡), Xiaohezi Township (小河子乡), Erdaoqu Township (二道渠乡), Da'erhao Hui Ethnic Township (大二号回族乡), Shandianhe Township (闪电河乡), Changliang Township (长梁乡), Fengyuandian Township (丰源店乡), Xixinying Township (西辛营乡), Lianhuatan Township (莲花滩乡), Baituyao Township (白土窑乡)

== Climate ==
Climate data for Guyuan, elevation 1,411 m (4,629 ft), (1991–2020 normals, extremes 1981–present)
Month	Jan	Feb	Mar	Apr	May	Jun	Jul	Aug	Sep	Oct	Nov	Dec	Year
Record high °C (°F)	5.7 (42.3)	12.8 (55.0)	20.1 (68.2)	27.5 (81.5)	32.7 (90.9)	34.0 (93.2)	36.1 (97.0)	33.5 (92.3)	31.0 (87.8)	23.6 (74.5)	17.6 (63.7)	11.6 (52.9)	36.1 (97.0)
Mean daily maximum °C (°F)	−9.3 (15.3)	−4.2 (24.4)	3.5 (38.3)	12.1 (53.8)	19.0 (66.2)	23.3 (73.9)	25.2 (77.4)	23.9 (75.0)	18.9 (66.0)	10.9 (51.6)	0.9 (33.6)	−7.2 (19.0)	9.8 (49.5)
Daily mean °C (°F)	−16.8 (1.8)	−12.3 (9.9)	−3.8 (25.2)	4.7 (40.5)	11.9 (53.4)	16.7 (62.1)	19.0 (66.2)	17.3 (63.1)	11.6 (52.9)	3.5 (38.3)	−6.0 (21.2)	−14.2 (6.4)	2.6 (36.8)
Mean daily minimum °C (°F)	−22.7 (−8.9)	−18.9 (−2.0)	−10.3 (13.5)	−2.3 (27.9)	4.5 (40.1)	10.1 (50.2)	13.4 (56.1)	11.6 (52.9)	5.5 (41.9)	−2.3 (27.9)	−11.5 (11.3)	−19.7 (−3.5)	−3.5 (25.6)
Record low °C (°F)	−37.8 (−36.0)	−39.9 (−39.8)	−29.5 (−21.1)	−15.8 (3.6)	−7.9 (17.8)	−6.6 (20.1)	5.1 (41.2)	−0.9 (30.4)	−5.6 (21.9)	−19.4 (−2.9)	−32.6 (−26.7)	−35.6 (−32.1)	−39.9 (−39.8)
Average precipitation mm (inches)	3.3 (0.13)	4.7 (0.19)	8.4 (0.33)	19.3 (0.76)	38.0 (1.50)	68.4 (2.69)	104.8 (4.13)	70.4 (2.77)	49.5 (1.95)	23.3 (0.92)	10.3 (0.41)	4.2 (0.17)	404.6 (15.95)
Average precipitation days (≥ 0.1 mm)	5.6	5.6	6.0	6.3	9.1	12.5	14.3	11.1	9.9	6.8	6.2	5.7	99.1
Average snowy days	8.3	8.2	8.2	5.6	1.6	0	0	0	0.6	4.1	8.4	10.0	55
Average relative humidity (%)	68	61	51	46	47	60	72	73	66	61	63	67	61
Mean monthly sunshine hours	216.5	220.9	267.2	269.8	293.1	279.6	267.7	265.7	247.1	238.0	205.0	197.9	2,968.5
Percentage possible sunshine	73	73	72	67	65	62	59	63	67	70	70	70	68
Source: China Meteorological Administrationall-time May high

== Official links ==
- Government website of Guyuan County, Zhangjiakou
- Guyuan County Business Window
- Guyuan County Administrative Rights Open Network
