= Bakeshiying =

Bakeshiying 巴克什营镇
- Town
- Bākè Shíyíng Zhèn
- Location in Hebei Location in China
- Coordinates: 40°43′25″N 117°11′35″E
- Country: People's Republic of China
- Province: Hebei
- Prefecture-level city: Chengde
- County: Luanping

Area
  - Total: 178.6 km^{2} (69.0 sq mi)

Population (2010)
  - Total: 17,216
  - Density: 96.38/km^{2} (249.6/sq mi)
- Time zone: UTC+8 (China Standard)

Bakeshiying (Chinese: 巴克什营镇; pinyin: Bākè Shíyíng Zhèn) is a town located in Luanping County, Chengde, Hebei, China. According to the 2010 census, Bakeshiying had a population of 17,216, including 8,728 males and 8,488 females. The population was distributed as follows: 3,591 people aged under 14, 12,078 people aged between 15 and 64, and 1,547 people aged over 65.

== See also ==
- List of township-level divisions of Hebei
