= Baituyao Township =

Baituyao Township 白土窑乡
- Rural Township
- Báitǔyáo Xiāng
- Location in Hebei Location in China
- Coordinates: 41°34′36″N 115°26′14″E
- Country: People's Republic of China
- Province: Hebei
- Prefecture-level city: Zhangjiakou
- County: Guyuan

Area
  - Total: 267.1 km^{2} (103.1 sq mi)

Population (2010)
  - Total: 10,127
  - Density: 37.91/km^{2} (98.2/sq mi)
- Time zone: UTC+8 (China Standard)

Baituyao Township (Chinese: 白土窑乡; pinyin: Báitǔyáo Xiāng) is a rural township located in Guyuan County, Zhangjiakou, Hebei, China. According to the 2010 census, Baituyao Township had a population of 10,127, including 5,134 males and 4,993 females. The population was distributed as follows: 1,558 people aged under 14, 7,433 people aged between 15 and 64, and 1,136 people aged over 65.

== See also ==
- List of township-level divisions of Hebei
