= Da'erhao Hui Ethnic Township =

Da'erhao Hui Ethnic Township 大二号回族乡
- Rural Township
- Dà'èrhào Huízú Xiāng
- Location in Hebei Location in China
- Coordinates: 41°44′37″N 116°01′21″E
- Country: People's Republic of China
- Province: Hebei
- Prefecture-level city: Zhangjiakou
- County: Guyuan

Area
  - Total: 54.63 km^{2} (21.09 sq mi)

Population (2010)
  - Total: 2,624
  - Density: 48.03/km^{2} (124.4/sq mi)
- Time zone: UTC+8 (China Standard)

Da'erhao Hui Ethnic Township (Chinese: 大二号回族乡; pinyin: Dà'èrhào Huízú Xiāng) is a rural township located in Guyuan County, Zhangjiakou, Hebei, China. According to the 2010 census, Da'erhao Hui Ethnic Township had a population of 2,624, including 1,344 males and 1,280 females. The population was distributed as follows: 433 people aged under 14, 1,949 people aged between 15 and 64, and 242 people aged over 65.

== See also ==
- List of township-level divisions of Hebei
