= Chengwei =

Chengwei 程委镇
- Town
- Chengwei Zhen
- Location in Hebei Location in China
- Coordinates: 38°22′04.5″N 115°34′02.2″E
- Country: People's Republic of China
- Province: Hebei
- Prefecture-level city: Baoding
- County: Boye County

Area
  - Total: 70.27 km^{2} (27.13 sq mi)

Population (2010)
  - Total: 40,111
  - Density: 570.8/km^{2} (1,478/sq mi)
- Time zone: UTC+8 (China Standard)
- Area code: 312

Chengwei (Chinese: 程委镇; pinyin: Chéngwěi Zhèn) is a town in Boye County, under the administration of Baoding, in the province of Hebei, China. According to the 2010 Chinese Census, Chengwei had a total population of 40,111 residents, of which 20,391 were male and 19,720 were female. The age distribution included 7,304 individuals aged 0–14, 28,635 aged 15–64, and 4,172 aged 65 and older.

== See also ==
- List of township-level divisions of Hebei
