= Changxiang Township =

Changxiang Township 长巷乡
- Rural Township
- Chángxiàng Xiāng
- Location in Hebei Location in China
- Coordinates: 36°24′34″N 114°32′55″E
- Country: People's Republic of China
- Province: Hebei
- Prefecture-level city: Handan
- County: Cheng'an

Area
  - Total: 37.85 km^{2} (14.61 sq mi)

Population (2010)
  - Total: 23,666
  - Density: 625.2/km^{2} (1,619/sq mi)
- Time zone: UTC+8 (China Standard)

Changxiang Township (Chinese: 长巷乡; pinyin: Chángxiàng Xiāng) is a rural township located in Cheng'an County, Handan, Hebei, China. According to the 2010 census, Changxiang Township had a population of 23,666, including 11,104 males and 12,562 females. The population was distributed as follows: 5,904 people aged under 14, 15,890 people aged between 15 and 64, and 1,872 people aged over 65.

== See also ==
- List of township-level divisions of Hebei
