= Boye Town =

Boye 博野镇
- Town
- Boye Zhen
- Location in Hebei Location in China
- Coordinates: 38°27′24.0″N 115°27′29.4″E
- Country: People's Republic of China
- Province: Hebei
- Prefecture-level city: Baoding
- County: Boye County

Area
  - Total: 78.44 km^{2} (30.29 sq mi)

Population (2010)
  - Total: 59,828
  - Density: 762.7/km^{2} (1,975/sq mi)
- Time zone: UTC+8 (China Standard)
- Area code: 312

Boye (Chinese: 博野镇; pinyin: Bóyě Zhèn) is a town located in Boye County, under the administration of Baoding, Hebei Province, China. As of the 2010 Chinese Census, the town had a total population of 59,828, consisting of 30,165 males and 29,663 females. The population distribution included 10,728 individuals aged 0–14, 44,365 aged 15–64, and 4,735 aged 65 and over.

== See also ==
- List of township-level divisions of Hebei
