= Datun Town (Luanping County) =

Datun Township 大屯鎮
- Township
- Location in Liaoning Datun Township (China)
- Coordinates: 40°59′14″N 117°24′29″E
- Country: China
- Province: Hebei
- Prefecture-level city: Chengde
- County: Luanping

Population (2023)
  - Total: 17,431
- Time zone: UTC+08:00 (China Standard)

Datun Town (Chinese: 大屯鎮) is a township-level administrative unit under Luanping County, Chengde City, Hebei Province, People's Republic of China. On March 29, 2017, Datun Manchu Township was upgraded to Datun Town.

== Administrative divisions ==
Datun Manchu Township includes the following areas:

- Datun Village (大屯村)
- Yanqing Village (菸青村)
- Dongyaoshang Village (東窯上村)
- Dongyuan Village (東院村)
- Erdaowopu Village (二道窩鋪村)
- Xingzhou Village (興洲村)
- Xiaochengzi Village (路南營村)
- Xiaochengzi Village (小城子村)
- Paizi Gou Village (蔄子溝村)
- Kuimugou Village (奎木溝村)
- Shaoguoying Village (燒鍋營村)
- Cengou Village (岑溝村)
- Yaoling Village (窯嶺村)
- Yaogoumen Village (窯溝門村)
