= Beimajuanzi =

Beimajuanzi 北马圈子镇
- Town
- Běimǎ Juānzi Zhèn
- Location in Hebei Location in China
- Coordinates: 40°31′18″N 117°35′50″E
- Country: People's Republic of China
- Province: Hebei
- Prefecture-level city: Chengde
- District: Yingshouyingzikuang

Area
  - Total: 25.03 km^{2} (9.66 sq mi)

Population (2010)
  - Total: 12,519
  - Density: 500.1/km^{2} (1,295/sq mi)
- Time zone: UTC+8 (China Standard)

Beimajuanzi (Chinese: 北马圈子镇; pinyin: Běimǎ Juānzi Zhèn) is a town located in Yingshouyingzikuang District, Chengde, Hebei, China. According to the 2010 census, Beimajuanzi had a population of 12,519, including 6,711 males and 5,808 females. The population was distributed as follows: 1,589 people aged under 14, 9,795 people aged between 15 and 64, and 1,135 people aged over 65.

== See also ==
- List of township-level divisions of Hebei
