= Erdaoqu Township =

Erdaoqu Township 二道渠乡
- Rural Township
- Èrdàoqú Xiāng
- Location in Hebei Location in China
- Coordinates: 41°45′41″N 115°53′13″E
- Country: People's Republic of China
- Province: Hebei
- Prefecture-level city: Zhangjiakou
- County: Guyuan

Area
  - Total: 167.9 km^{2} (64.8 sq mi)

Population (2010)
  - Total: 8,137
  - Density: 48.45/km^{2} (125.5/sq mi)
- Time zone: UTC+8 (China Standard)

Erdaoqu Township (Chinese: 二道渠乡; pinyin: Èrdàoqú Xiāng) is a rural township located in Guyuan County, Zhangjiakou, Hebei, China. According to the 2010 census, Erdaoqu Township had a population of 8,137, including 4,192 males and 3,945 females. The population was distributed as follows: 1,319 people aged under 14, 6,127 people aged between 15 and 64, and 691 people aged over 65.

== See also ==
- List of township-level divisions of Hebei
