= Fujiazuo Township =

Fujiazuo Township 付家佐乡
- Rural Township
- Fùjiāzuŏ Xiāng
- Location in Hebei Location in China
- Coordinates: 38°26′38″N 115°44′03″E
- Country: People's Republic of China
- Province: Hebei
- Prefecture-level city: Cangzhou
- County: Suning

Area
  - Total: 49.90 km^{2} (19.27 sq mi)

Population (2010)
  - Total: 27,605
  - Density: 553.3/km^{2} (1,433/sq mi)
- Time zone: UTC+8 (China Standard)

Fujiazuo Township (Chinese: 付家佐乡; pinyin: Fùjiāzuŏ Xiāng) is a rural township located in Suning County, Cangzhou, Hebei, China. According to the 2010 census, Fujiazuo Township had a population of 27,605, including 14,122 males and 13,483 females. The population was distributed as follows: 4,482 people aged under 14, 20,351 people aged between 15 and 64, and 2,772 people aged over 65.

== See also ==
- List of township-level divisions of Hebei
