= Cheng'an, Cheng'an County =

Cheng'an 成安镇
- Town
- Chéng'ān Zhèn
- Location in Hebei Location in China
- Coordinates: 36°26′16″N 114°41′29″E
- Country: People's Republic of China
- Province: Hebei
- Prefecture-level city: Handan
- County: Cheng'an

Area
  - Total: 51.70 km^{2} (19.96 sq mi)

Population (2010)
  - Total: 76,075
- Time zone: UTC+8 (China Standard)

Cheng'an (Chinese: 成安镇; pinyin: Chéng'ān Zhèn) is a town located in Cheng'an County, Handan, Hebei, China. According to the 2010 census, Cheng'an had a population of 76,075, including 37,604 males and 38,471 females. The population was distributed as follows: 16,183 people aged under 14, 55,264 people aged between 15 and 64, and 4,628 people aged over 65.

== See also ==
- List of township-level divisions of Hebei
