= Danqinghe Township =

Danqinghe Township 丹清河乡
- Rural Township
- Dānqīnghé Xiāng
- Location in Hebei Location in China
- Coordinates: 41°40′07″N 114°40′57″E
- Country: People's Republic of China
- Province: Hebei
- Prefecture-level city: Zhangjiakou
- County: Kangbao

Area
  - Total: 202.7 km^{2} (78.3 sq mi)

Population (2010)
  - Total: 8,171
  - Density: 40.3/km^{2} (104/sq mi)
- Time zone: UTC+8 (China Standard)

Danqinghe Township (Chinese: 丹清河乡; pinyin: Dānqīnghé Xiāng) is a rural township located in Kangbao County, Zhangjiakou, Hebei, China. According to the 2010 census, Danqinghe Township had a population of 8,171, including 4,171 males and 4,000 females. The population was distributed as follows: 1,041 people aged under 14, 5,943 people aged between 15 and 64, and 1,187 people aged over 65.

== See also ==
- List of township-level divisions of Hebei
