= Xiaohezi Township =

Coordinates: 41°34′12″N 115°38′40″E

Xiaohezi Township 小河子乡
- Township

Chinese transcription(s)
- Interactive map of Xiaohezi Township
- Country: China
- Province: Hebei
- Prefecture: Zhangjiakou
- County: Guyuan
- Time zone: UTC+8 (China Standard Time)

Xiaohezi Township (Chinese: 小河子乡; pinyin: Xiǎohézǐ Xiāng) is a township in Guyuan County, Zhangjiakou, Hebei, China.

== See also ==
- List of township-level divisions of Hebei
