= Erhaobu Township =

Erhaobu Township 二号卜乡
- Rural Township
- Èrhàobŭ Xiāng
- Location in Hebei Location in China
- Coordinates: 41°38′17″N 114°20′09″E
- Country: People's Republic of China
- Province: Hebei
- Prefecture-level city: Zhangjiakou
- County: Kangbao

Area
  - Total: 179.9 km^{2} (69.5 sq mi)

Population (2010)
  - Total: 11,698
  - Density: 65.01/km^{2} (168.4/sq mi)
- Time zone: UTC+8 (China Standard)

Erhaobu Township (Chinese: 二号卜乡; pinyin: Èrhàobŭ Xiāng) is a rural township located in Kangbao County, Zhangjiakou, Hebei, China. According to the 2010 census, Erhaobu Township had a population of 11,698, including 5,942 males and 5,756 females. The population was distributed as follows: 1,674 people aged under 14, 8,487 people aged between 15 and 64, and 1,537 people aged over 65.

== See also ==
- List of township-level divisions of Hebei
