= Xiaodian, Hebei =

Xiaodian 小店镇
- Town
- Xiaodian Zhen
- Location in Hebei Location in China
- Coordinates: 38°31′52.2″N 115°27′09.1″E
- Country: People's Republic of China
- Province: Hebei
- Prefecture-level city: Baoding
- County: Boye County

Area
  - Total: 29.92 km^{2} (11.55 sq mi)

Population (2010)
  - Total: 30,696
  - Density: 1,026/km^{2} (2,660/sq mi)
- Time zone: UTC+8 (China Standard)
- Area code: 312

Xiaodian (Chinese: 小店镇; pinyin: Xiǎodiàn Zhèn) is a town located in Boye County, under the administration of Baoding, Hebei Province, China. As of the 2010 Chinese Census, the town had a population of 30,696, including 15,456 males and 15,240 females. Age distribution included 5,876 people aged 0–14, 22,271 aged 15–64, and 2,549 aged 65 and over.

== See also ==
- List of township-level divisions of Hebei
