= Anchungoumen Manchu Ethnic Township =

Anchungoumen Manchu Ethnic Township 安纯沟门满族乡
- Rural Township
- Ānchún Gōumén Mǎnzú Xiāng
- Location in Hebei Location in China
- Coordinates: 40°52′49″N 117°11′32″E
- Country: People's Republic of China
- Province: Hebei
- Prefecture-level city: Chengde
- County: Luanping

Area
  - Total: 162.1 km^{2} (62.6 sq mi)

Population (2010)
  - Total: 10,823
  - Density: 66.76/km^{2} (172.9/sq mi)
- Time zone: UTC+8 (China Standard)

Anchungoumen Manchu Ethnic Township (Chinese: 安纯沟门满族乡; pinyin: Ānchún Gōumén Mǎnzú Xiāng) is a rural township located in Luanping County, Chengde, Hebei, China. According to the 2010 census, Anchungoumen Manchu Ethnic Township had a population of 10,823, including 5,678 males and 5,145 females. The population was distributed as follows: 2,005 people aged under 14, 7,538 people aged between 15 and 64, and 1,280 people aged over 65.

== See also ==
- List of township-level divisions of Hebei
