= Kangbao Town =

Kangbao 康保镇
- Town
- Location in Hebei
- Coordinates: 41°51′04″N 114°37′03″E
- Country: People's Republic of China
- Province: Hebei
- Prefecture-level city: Zhangjiakou
- County: Kangbao
- Village-level divisions: 5 residential communities 37 villages
- Elevation: 1,425 m (4,675 ft)

Population (2010)
  - Total: 63,779
- Time zone: UTC+8 (China Standard)
- Postal code: 076650
- Area code: 0313

Kangbao Town (simplified Chinese: 康保镇; traditional Chinese: 康保鎮; pinyin: Kāngbǎo Zhèn) is a town and the seat of Kangbao County in far northwestern Hebei province, People's Republic of China, and was formerly a part of the province of Chahar. As of 2011, it has 5 residential communities (居委会) and 37 villages under its administration.

== See also ==
- List of township-level divisions of Hebei
