= Kaiping, Tangshan =

Kaiping District 开平区
- District
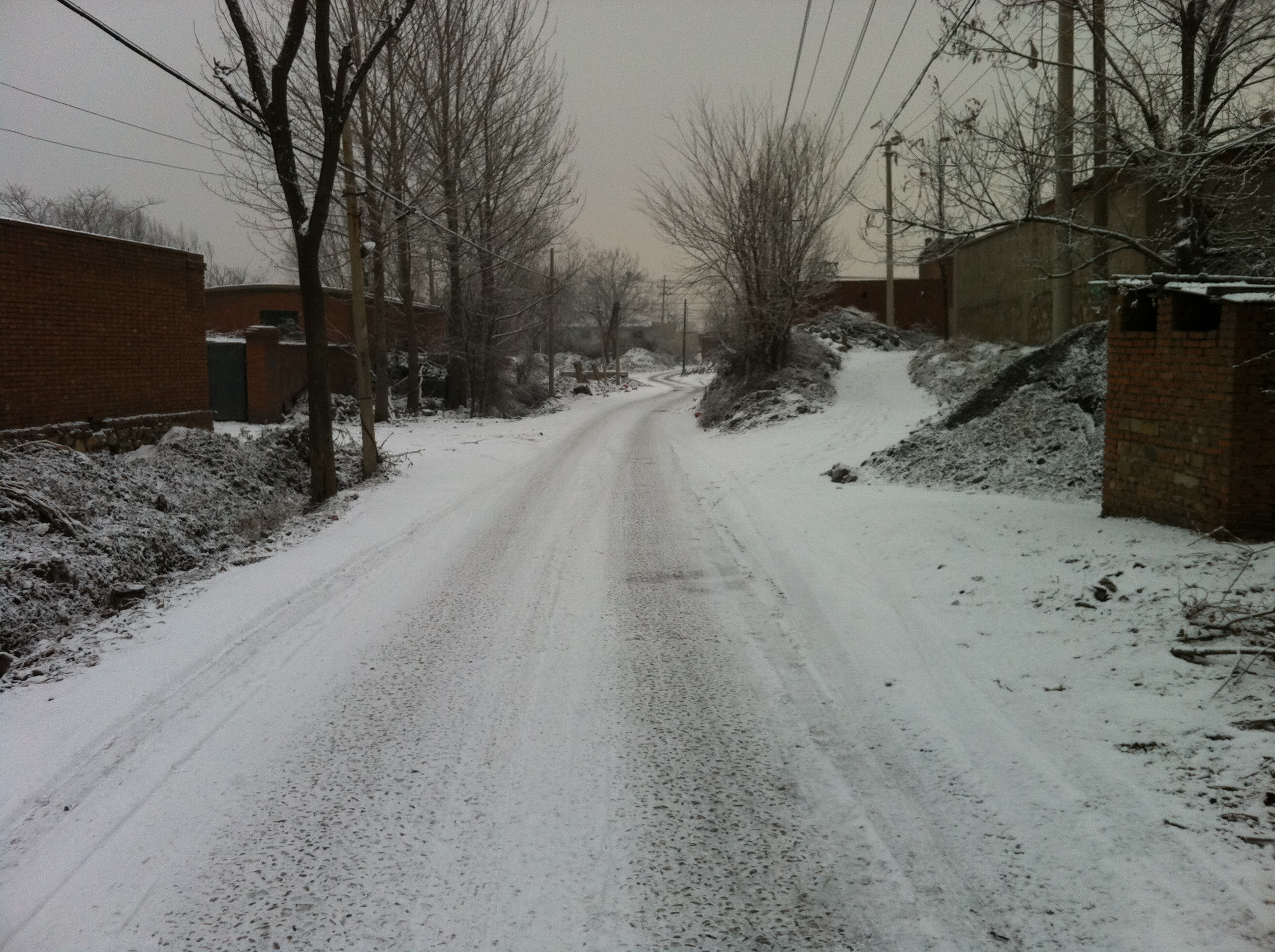
- A winter scene in Kaiping District

- Location in Hebei
- Coordinates: 39°40′16″N 118°15′43″E
- Country: People's Republic of China
- Province: Hebei
- Prefecture-level city: Tangshan

Area
  - Total: 236 km^{2} (91 sq mi)

Population (2012)
  - Total: 240,000
  - Density: 1,000/km^{2} (2,600/sq mi)
- Time zone: UTC+8 (China Standard)

Kaiping District (simplified Chinese: 开平区; traditional Chinese: 開平區; pinyin: Kāipíng Qū) is a district of Tangshan, Hebei, China. The district spans an area of 236 square kilometres (91 mi^{2}), and has a population of about 240,000 as of 2012.

== History ==
From the Qin dynasty to the Han dynasty, the present-day Kaiping District was part of Youbeiping Commandery. During the Tang dynasty, the area was reorganized as Shicheng County (Chinese: 石城县; pinyin: Shíchéng Xiàn). Shicheng County was abolished during the Liao dynasty. The area was reorganized as Yifeng County (Chinese: 义丰县; pinyin: Yìfēng Xiàn) during the Yuan dynasty. During the Ming dynasty, the area fell under the jurisdiction of Zhending Fu. In the Qing dynasty, the area was split between Luanzhou County (Chinese: 滦州县; pinyin: Luánzhōu Xiàn) and Fengrun County (Chinese: 丰润县; pinyin: Fēngrùn Xiàn).

=== People's Republic of China ===
In 1949, upon the establishment of the People's Republic of China, the area was reorganized as Tangshan Fifth District (Chinese: 唐山市第五区; pinyin: Tángshān Shì Dì Wǔ Qū). In 1956, it was placed under the jurisdiction of Jiao District (Chinese: 郊区; pinyin: Jiāo Qū; lit. 'Suburb'). The area was briefly organized as Kaiping District from 1961 to 1965, before being replaced by Jiao District. In 1982, Kaiping District was re-established.

== Geography ==
Kaiping District is located near the southern foothills of the Yan Mountains. Elevation in the district ranges from 11 metres (36 ft) to 296.6 metres (973 ft) above sea level, with the northern portion of the district generally having a higher elevation.

Major rivers in Kaiping District include Shiliu River (Chinese: 石榴河; pinyin: Shíliú Hé; lit. 'Pomegranate River') and Dou River.

== Administrative divisions ==
Kaiping District administers five subdistricts and six towns.

=== Subdistricts ===
The five subdistricts in Kaiping District are Majiagou Subdistrict, Kaiping Subdistrict, Shuiwuzhuang Subdistrict, Doudian Subdistrict, and Jinggezhuang Subdistrict.

=== Towns ===
The six towns in Kaiping District are Kaiping, Liyuan, Yuehe, Shuangqiao, Zhengzhuangzi, and Wali.

== Demographics ==
Kaiping District has an estimated population of about 240,000 as of 2010. In the 2010 Chinese census, Kaiping District had a recorded population of 262,571, down slightly from 266,378 in the 2000 Chinese Census. The district had an estimated population of 259,000 in 1996.

== Economy ==
Kaiping District's main industries include coal, building materials, chemicals, and ceramics.

Major mineral deposits in Kaiping District include coal, bauxite, sand, and gravel.

== Transportation ==
The Beijing–Harbin railway and National Highway 205 both run through Kaiping District.
