= Suning County =

Suning County 肃宁县
- County
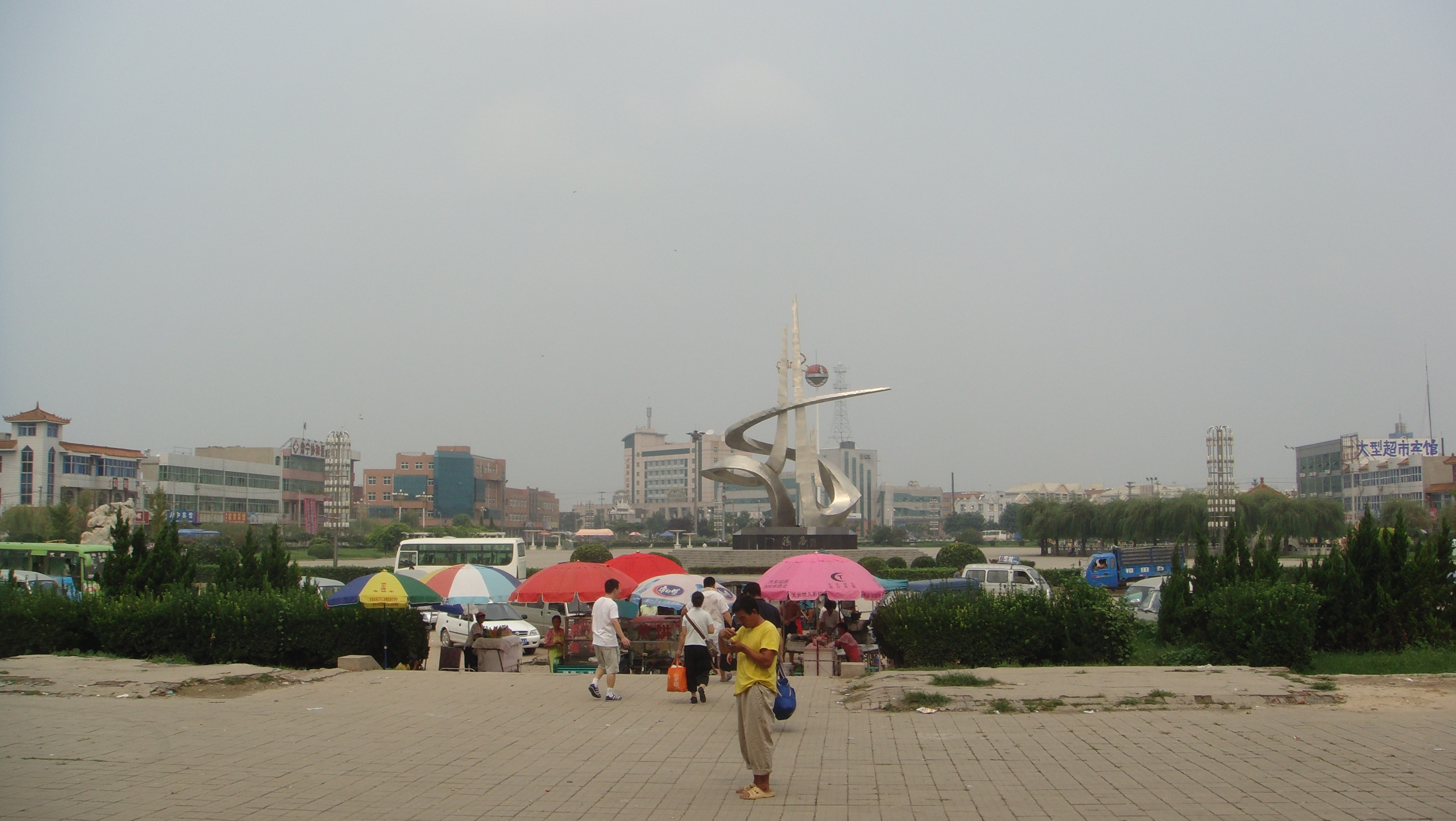

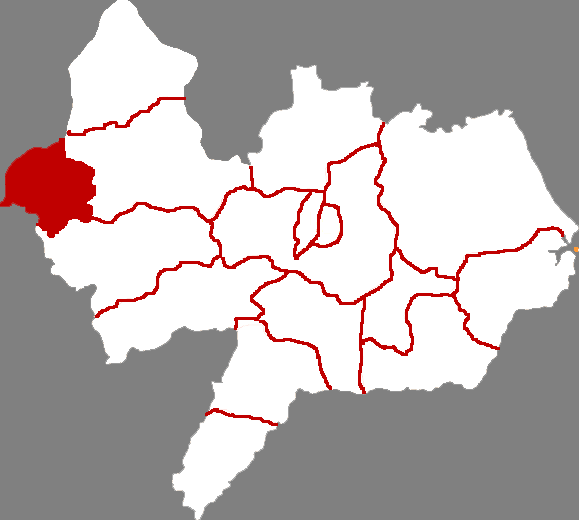
- Suning in Cangzhou

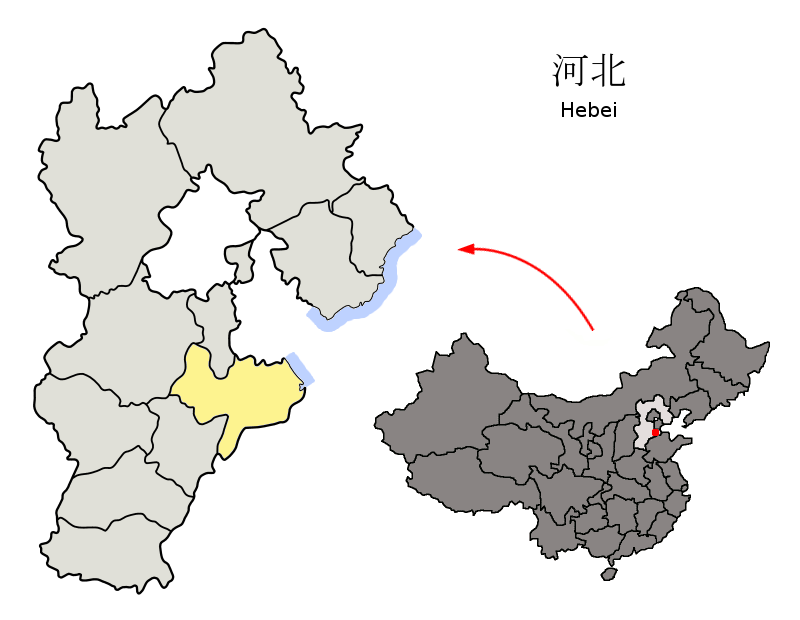
- Cangzhou in Hebei
- Coordinates: 38°25′22″N 115°49′47″E
- Country: People's Republic of China
- Province: Hebei
- Prefecture-level city: Cangzhou
- County seat: Suning Town (肃宁镇)

Area
  - Total: 497 km^{2} (192 sq mi)
- Elevation: 16 m (52 ft)

Population (2020)
  - Total: 341,919
  - Density: 688/km^{2} (1,780/sq mi)
- Time zone: UTC+8 (China Standard)
- Postal code: 063250
- Area code: 0317

Suning County (simplified Chinese: 肃宁县; traditional Chinese: 肅寧縣; pinyin: Sùníng Xiàn) is a county in the central part of Hebei province, China. It is under the administration of the prefecture-level city of Cangzhou, and as of 2020, it had a population of 341,919 residing in an area of 497 km^{2} (192 sq mi).

== Administrative divisions ==
There are 5 towns and 4 townships under the county's administration.

Towns:

- Suning (肃宁镇), Liangjiacun (梁家村镇), Wobei (窝北镇), Shangcun (尚村镇), Wanli (万里镇)

Townships:

- Shisuo Township (师素乡), Hebeiliushansi Township (河北留善寺乡), Fujiazuo Township (付家佐乡), Shaozhuang Township (邵庄乡)

== Climate ==
Climate data for Suning, elevation 14 m (46 ft), (1991–2020 normals, extremes 1981–2010)
Month	Jan	Feb	Mar	Apr	May	Jun	Jul	Aug	Sep	Oct	Nov	Dec	Year
Record high °C (°F)	17.3 (63.1)	23.4 (74.1)	30.4 (86.7)	34.5 (94.1)	39.0 (102.2)	40.6 (105.1)	41.1 (106.0)	37.6 (99.7)	35.1 (95.2)	31.7 (89.1)	23.9 (75.0)	19.6 (67.3)	41.1 (106.0)
Mean daily maximum °C (°F)	2.8 (37.0)	7.1 (44.8)	14.3 (57.7)	21.7 (71.1)	27.4 (81.3)	31.9 (89.4)	32.3 (90.1)	30.5 (86.9)	26.8 (80.2)	20.5 (68.9)	11.0 (51.8)	4.2 (39.6)	19.2 (66.6)
Daily mean °C (°F)	−3.5 (25.7)	0.5 (32.9)	7.4 (45.3)	14.9 (58.8)	20.8 (69.4)	25.5 (77.9)	27.1 (80.8)	25.4 (77.7)	20.4 (68.7)	13.4 (56.1)	4.9 (40.8)	−1.6 (29.1)	12.9 (55.3)
Mean daily minimum °C (°F)	−8.5 (16.7)	−4.7 (23.5)	1.5 (34.7)	8.4 (47.1)	14.3 (57.7)	19.6 (67.3)	22.6 (72.7)	21.2 (70.2)	15.3 (59.5)	7.8 (46.0)	0.0 (32.0)	−6.1 (21.0)	7.6 (45.7)
Record low °C (°F)	−22.5 (−8.5)	−18.2 (−0.8)	−10.3 (13.5)	−2.7 (27.1)	2.8 (37.0)	8.4 (47.1)	15.9 (60.6)	11.1 (52.0)	4.5 (40.1)	−4.6 (23.7)	−16.1 (3.0)	−22.6 (−8.7)	−22.6 (−8.7)
Average precipitation mm (inches)	2.1 (0.08)	5.3 (0.21)	8.2 (0.32)	25.8 (1.02)	35.8 (1.41)	64.3 (2.53)	143.8 (5.66)	123.5 (4.86)	43.1 (1.70)	26.1 (1.03)	13.4 (0.53)	2.7 (0.11)	494.1 (19.46)
Average precipitation days (≥ 0.1 mm)	1.4	2.2	2.7	5.0	5.5	8.2	11.1	9.7	6.1	4.6	3.6	1.8	61.9
Average snowy days	2.3	2.1	0.8	0.2	0	0	0	0	0	0	1.4	2.5	9.3
Average relative humidity (%)	59	54	50	54	59	61	75	81	76	69	68	63	64
Mean monthly sunshine hours	167.0	174.0	224.8	236.8	269.9	237.4	201.4	207.2	205.8	192.8	159.6	158.4	2,435.1
Percentage possible sunshine	55	57	60	59	61	54	45	50	56	56	53	54	55
Source: China Meteorological Administration
