= Cheng'an County =

Cheng'an County 成安县 Chengan
- County
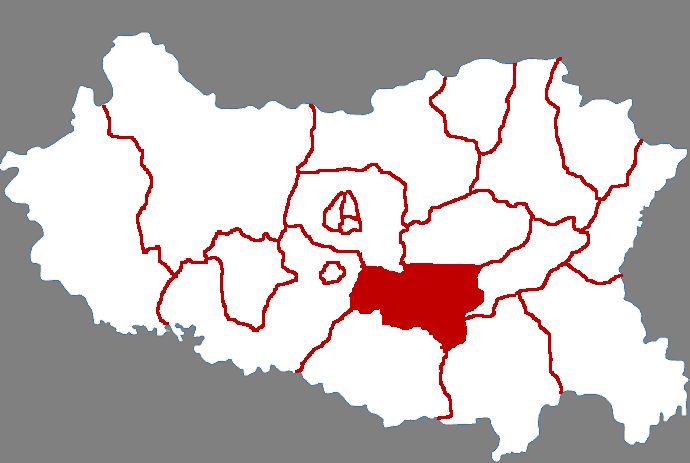
- Location of Cheng'an (成安) county in Handan City, Henan, China

- Location in Hebei
- Coordinates: 36°25′N 114°41′E
- Country: People's Republic of China
- Province: Hebei
- Prefecture-level city: Handan
- County seat: Cheng'an Town (成安镇)

Area
  - Total: 485 km^{2} (187 sq mi)
- Elevation: 60 m (200 ft)
- Time zone: UTC+8 (China Standard)
- Postal code: 056700

Cheng'an (Chinese: 成安; pinyin: Chéng'ān; lit. 'become peace') is a county of southern Hebei province, China. It is under the administration of Handan City, about 25 km (16 mi) to the northwest.

== Administrative divisions ==
There are 4 towns and 5 townships under the county's administration.

The towns are Cheng'an (成安镇), Shangcheng (商城镇), Zhanghedian (漳河店镇), and Lijiatuan (李家疃镇). The townships are Xinyi Township (辛义乡), Baisiying Township (柏寺营乡), Daodongbao Township (道东堡乡), Beixiangyi Township (北乡义乡), and Changxiang Township (长巷乡).

== Climate ==
Climate data for Cheng'an, elevation 58 m (190 ft), (1991–2020 normals, extremes 1981–present)
Month	Jan	Feb	Mar	Apr	May	Jun	Jul	Aug	Sep	Oct	Nov	Dec	Year
Record high °C (°F)	19.9 (67.8)	25.0 (77.0)	29.8 (85.6)	36.3 (97.3)	38.6 (101.5)	42.3 (108.1)	41.4 (106.5)	36.4 (97.5)	38.6 (101.5)	33.6 (92.5)	27.9 (82.2)	25.3 (77.5)	42.3 (108.1)
Mean daily maximum °C (°F)	4.0 (39.2)	8.6 (47.5)	15.1 (59.2)	21.7 (71.1)	27.3 (81.1)	32.4 (90.3)	32.2 (90.0)	30.5 (86.9)	27.1 (80.8)	21.4 (70.5)	12.7 (54.9)	5.8 (42.4)	19.9 (67.8)
Daily mean °C (°F)	−1.8 (28.8)	2.1 (35.8)	8.5 (47.3)	15.1 (59.2)	20.9 (69.6)	25.9 (78.6)	27.1 (80.8)	25.4 (77.7)	20.8 (69.4)	14.6 (58.3)	6.4 (43.5)	0.0 (32.0)	13.8 (56.7)
Mean daily minimum °C (°F)	−6.5 (20.3)	−3.0 (26.6)	2.8 (37.0)	9.2 (48.6)	14.9 (58.8)	20 (68)	22.8 (73.0)	21.4 (70.5)	15.9 (60.6)	9.2 (48.6)	1.4 (34.5)	−4.3 (24.3)	8.7 (47.6)
Record low °C (°F)	−18.4 (−1.1)	−16.7 (1.9)	−9.0 (15.8)	−1.9 (28.6)	5.2 (41.4)	10.8 (51.4)	15.8 (60.4)	12.5 (54.5)	4.1 (39.4)	−2.3 (27.9)	−17.7 (0.1)	−18.5 (−1.3)	−18.5 (−1.3)
Average precipitation mm (inches)	3.2 (0.13)	6.8 (0.27)	9.7 (0.38)	28.4 (1.12)	38.5 (1.52)	63.3 (2.49)	146.3 (5.76)	90.7 (3.57)	45.3 (1.78)	29.4 (1.16)	15.1 (0.59)	3.9 (0.15)	480.6 (18.92)
Average precipitation days (≥ 0.1 mm)	1.9	3.2	3.0	5.2	6.4	7.8	10.5	9.2	7.0	5.0	4.1	2.2	65.5
Average snowy days	2.7	2.8	1.0	0.2	0	0	0	0	0	0	1.1	2.4	10.2
Average relative humidity (%)	62	59	56	62	65	62	78	83	77	70	69	66	67
Mean monthly sunshine hours	130.4	148.6	196.4	218.5	247.3	225.0	188.8	196.3	180.4	175.0	146.4	136.6	2,189.7
Percentage possible sunshine	42	48	53	55	56	51	43	47	49	51	48	46	49
Source: China Meteorological Administration all-time January high
