= Yingshouyingzikuang, Chengde =

Yingshouyingzi Mining District 鹰手营子矿区
- District
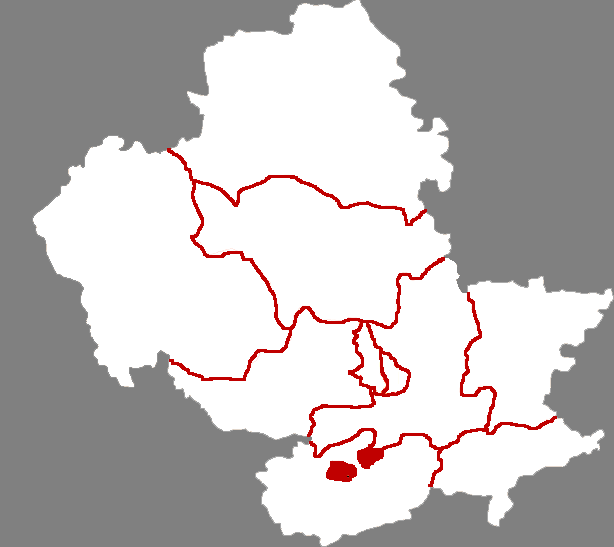
- Yingshouyingzi in Chengde

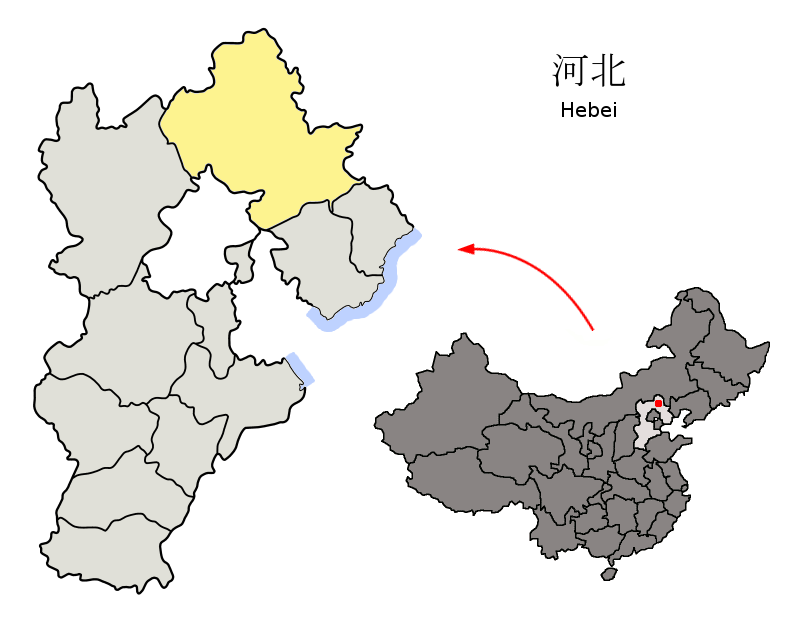
- Chengde in Hebei
- Coordinates: 40°32′47″N 117°39′34″E
- Country: People's Republic of China
- Province: Hebei
- Prefecture-level city: Chengde

Area
  - Total: 150.6 km^{2} (58.1 sq mi)

Population (2020 census)
  - Total: 54,730
  - Density: 363.4/km^{2} (941.2/sq mi)
- Time zone: UTC+8 (China Standard)

Yingshouyingzi Mining District (simplified Chinese: 鹰手营子矿区; traditional Chinese: 鷹手營子礦區; pinyin: Yīngshǒuyíngzǐ Kuàng Qū) is a district of Chengde, Hebei, China.

== Administrative divisions ==
Towns:

- Wangjiazhuang (汪家庄镇)
- Yingshouyingzi (鹰手营子镇)
- Shouwangfen (寿王坟镇)
- Beimaquanzi (北马圈子镇)
