= Shuangluan, Changde =

Shuangluan 双滦区
- District
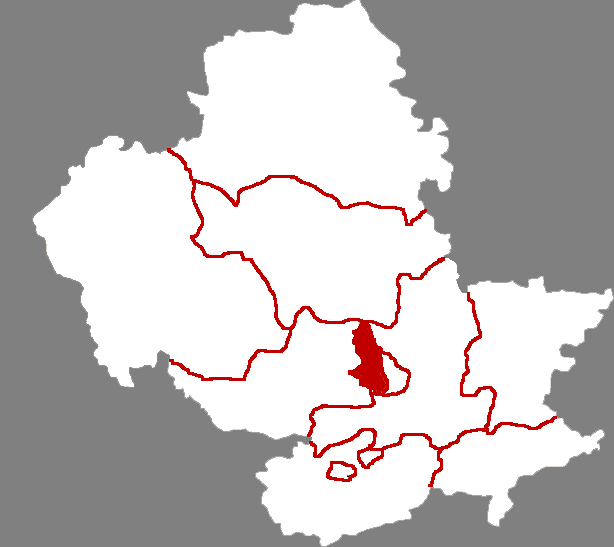
- Shuangluan in Chengde

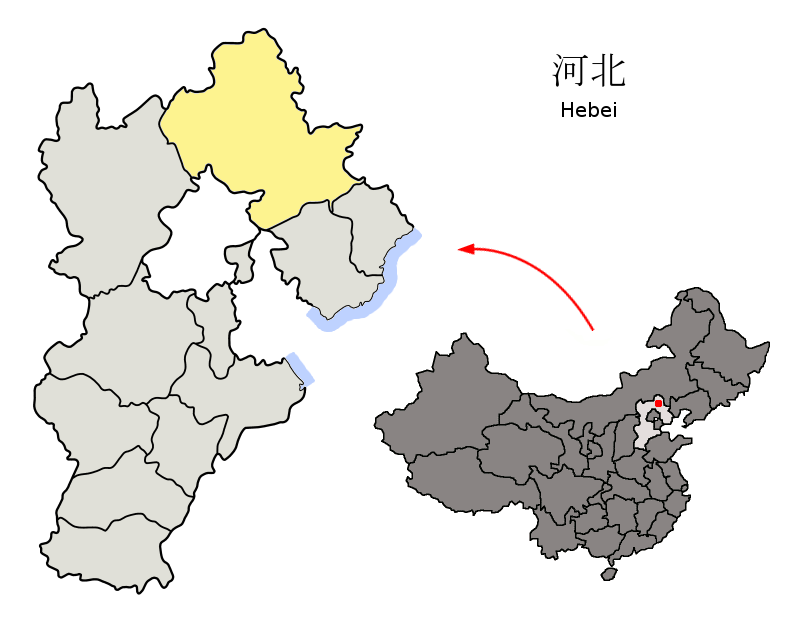
- Chengde in Hebei
- Coordinates: 40°57′33″N 117°48′00″E
- Country: People's Republic of China
- Province: Hebei
- Prefecture-level city: Chengde
- District seat: Yuanbaoshan Subdistrict (元宝山街道)

Area
  - Total: 338 km^{2} (131 sq mi)
- Elevation: 375 m (1,230 ft)

Population (2020 census)
  - Total: 187,361
  - Density: 554/km^{2} (1,440/sq mi)
- Time zone: UTC+8 (China Standard)
- Postal code: 067000
- Area code: 0314

Shuangluan District (simplified Chinese: 双滦区; traditional Chinese: 雙灤區; pinyin: Shuāngluán Qū) is a district of Chengde, Hebei province, China. As of 2020, it has a population of 187,361 residing in an area of 250 km^{2} (97 sq mi).

== Administrative divisions ==
There are 2 subdistricts, 4 towns, 1 township, and 1 ethnic township under the district's administration.

Subdistricts:

- Yuanbaoshan Subdistrict (元宝山街道), Gangcheng Subdistrict (钢城街道)

Towns:

- Shuangtashan (双塔山镇), Luanhe (滦河镇), Damiao (大庙镇), Pianqiaozi (偏桥子镇)

Townships:

- Chenzhazi Township (陈栅子乡), Xidi Manchu Ethnic Township (西地满族乡)
