= Boye County =

Boye County 博野县 Poyeh
- County
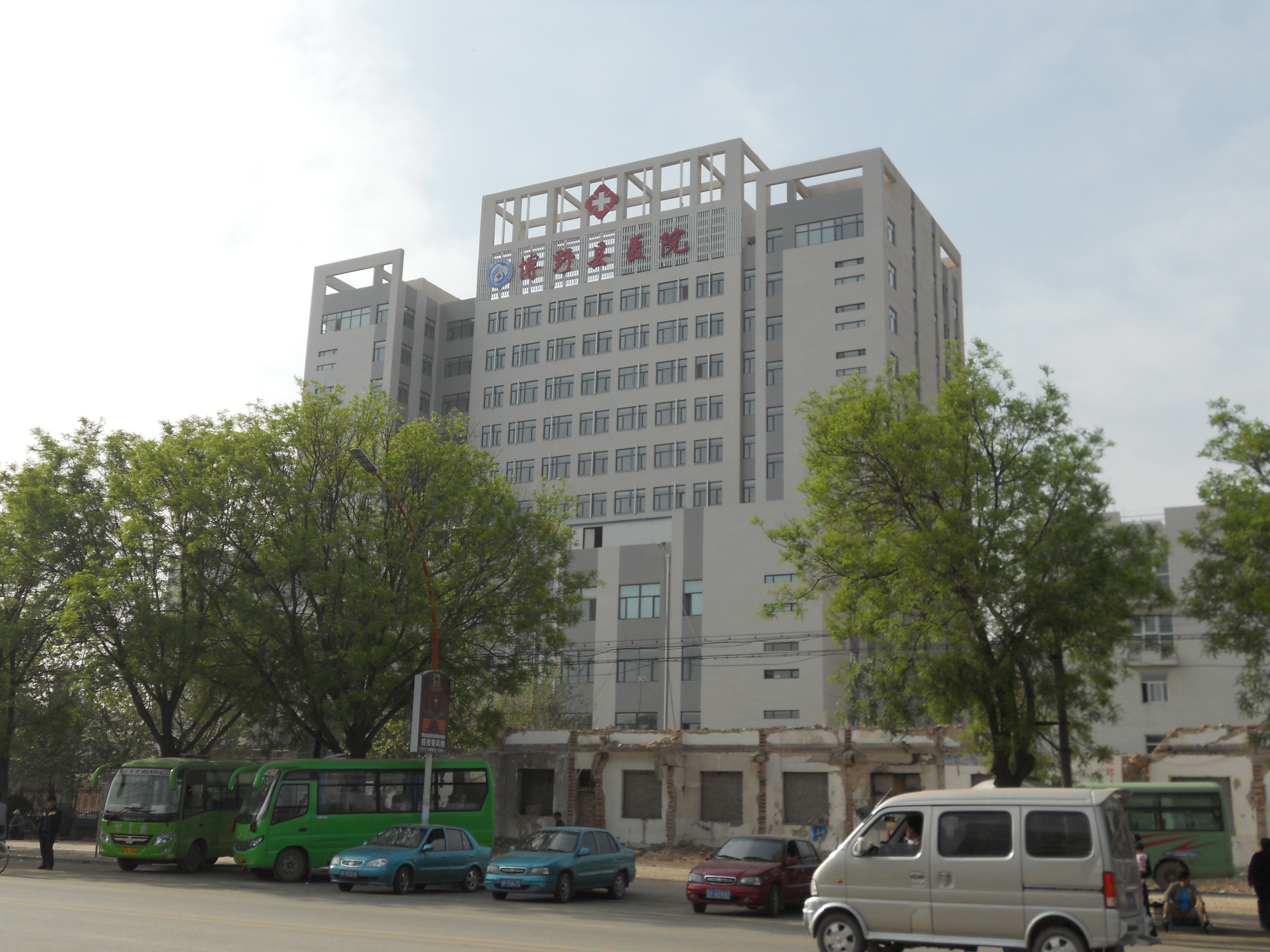

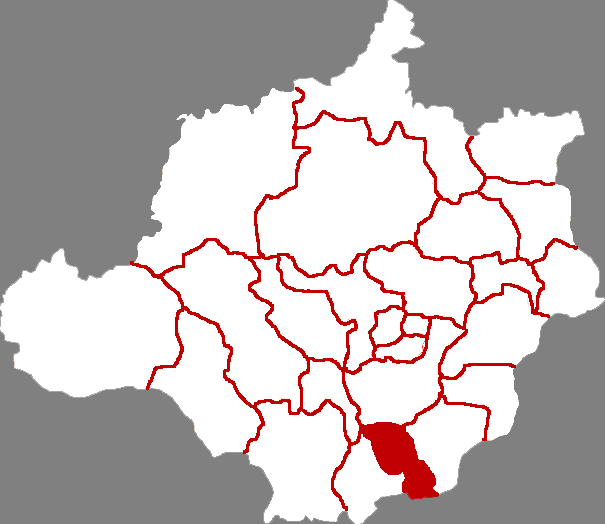
- Boye in Baoding

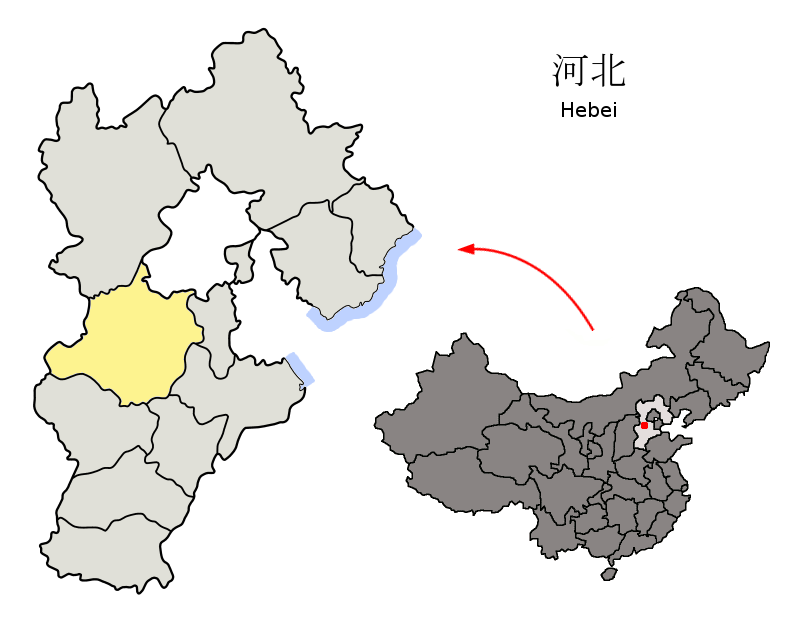
- Baoding in Hebei
- Coordinates: 38°27′25″N 115°27′50″E
- Country: People's Republic of China
- Province: Hebei
- Prefecture-level city: Baoding
- County seat: Boye Town (博野镇)

Area
  - Total: 331 km^{2} (128 sq mi)
- Elevation: 26 m (85 ft)

Population (2020 census)
  - Total: 225,065
  - Density: 680/km^{2} (1,760/sq mi)
- Time zone: UTC+8 (China Standard)
- Postal code: 071300

Boye (Chinese: 博野; pinyin: Bóyě) is a county in south-central Hebei province, China. It is under the jurisdiction of Baoding City, about 46 km (29 mi) due north, and as of 2020, it has a population of 225,065 residing in an area of 331 km^{2} (128 sq mi).

== Administrative divisions ==
There are 3 towns and 4 townships under the county's administration.

Towns:

- Boye (博野镇), Xiaodian (小店镇), Chengwei (程委镇)

Townships:

- Dongxu Township (东墟乡), Beiyangcun Township (北杨村乡), Chengdong Township (城东乡), Nanxiaowang Township (南小王乡)
