= Kangbao County =

Kangbao County 康保县
- County
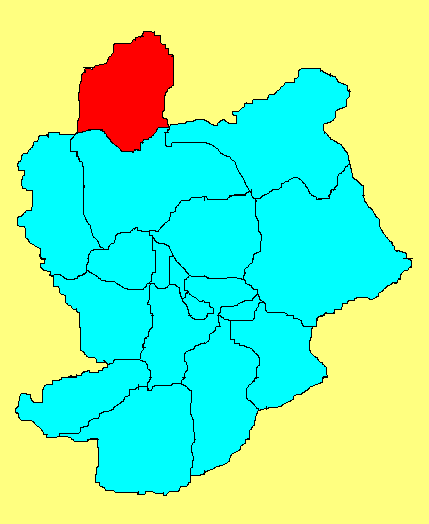
- Location in Zhangjiakou

- Location of the seat in Hebei
- Coordinates: 41°51′N 114°37′E
- Country: People's Republic of China
- Province: Hebei
- Prefecture-level city: Zhangjiakou
- County seat: Kangbao Town

Area
  - Total: 3,364 km^{2} (1,299 sq mi)

Population (2020 census)
  - Total: 138,205
  - Density: 41.08/km^{2} (106.4/sq mi)
- Time zone: UTC+8 (China Standard)
- Postal code: 076650

Kangbao County (simplified Chinese: 康保县; traditional Chinese: 康保縣; pinyin: Kāngbǎo Xiàn) is a county in the northwest of Hebei province, China. It is under the administration of Zhangjiakou City and is its northernmost county-level division, bordering Inner Mongolia to the north, east, and west.

== Administrative divisions ==
Towns:

- Kangbao Town (康保镇), Zhangji (张纪镇), Tuchengzi (土城子镇), Dengyoufang (邓油坊镇), Lijiadi (李家地镇), Zhaoyanghe (照阳河镇), Tunken (屯垦镇)

Townships:

- Geyoufang Township (阎油房乡), Danqinghe Township (丹清河乡), Habiga Township (哈必嘎乡), Erhaobu Township (二号卜乡), Lujiaying Township (芦家营乡), Zhongyi Township (忠义乡), Chuchangdi Township (处长地乡), Mandetang Township (满德堂乡)

== Climate ==
Climate data for Kangbao, elevation 1,435 m (4,708 ft), (1991–2020 normals, extremes 1981–2010)
Month	Jan	Feb	Mar	Apr	May	Jun	Jul	Aug	Sep	Oct	Nov	Dec	Year
Record high °C (°F)	5.5 (41.9)	12.7 (54.9)	20.8 (69.4)	29.3 (84.7)	31.9 (89.4)	35.7 (96.3)	36.7 (98.1)	32.7 (90.9)	31.7 (89.1)	23.4 (74.1)	16.0 (60.8)	11.3 (52.3)	36.7 (98.1)
Mean daily maximum °C (°F)	−9.0 (15.8)	−4.1 (24.6)	3.6 (38.5)	12.2 (54.0)	19.1 (66.4)	23.6 (74.5)	25.6 (78.1)	24.2 (75.6)	19.0 (66.2)	10.8 (51.4)	0.8 (33.4)	−7.3 (18.9)	9.9 (49.8)
Daily mean °C (°F)	−17.0 (1.4)	−12.6 (9.3)	−4.2 (24.4)	4.6 (40.3)	12.0 (53.6)	17.0 (62.6)	19.4 (66.9)	17.6 (63.7)	11.6 (52.9)	3.1 (37.6)	−6.7 (19.9)	−14.6 (5.7)	2.5 (36.5)
Mean daily minimum °C (°F)	−23.2 (−9.8)	−19.4 (−2.9)	−11.1 (12.0)	−2.9 (26.8)	4.1 (39.4)	9.8 (49.6)	13.1 (55.6)	11.1 (52.0)	4.7 (40.5)	−3.3 (26.1)	−12.6 (9.3)	−20.4 (−4.7)	−4.2 (24.5)
Record low °C (°F)	−37.3 (−35.1)	−34.1 (−29.4)	−31.5 (−24.7)	−16.6 (2.1)	−9.0 (15.8)	−3.8 (25.2)	2.2 (36.0)	0.2 (32.4)	−7.3 (18.9)	−18.2 (−0.8)	−32.0 (−25.6)	−35.0 (−31.0)	−37.3 (−35.1)
Average precipitation mm (inches)	2.2 (0.09)	3.1 (0.12)	5.8 (0.23)	17.0 (0.67)	35.0 (1.38)	57.9 (2.28)	91.8 (3.61)	64.1 (2.52)	41.3 (1.63)	16.7 (0.66)	8.1 (0.32)	2.9 (0.11)	345.9 (13.62)
Average precipitation days (≥ 0.1 mm)	3.9	3.9	4.5	5.8	8.1	11.6	13.2	10.4	9.6	6.3	5.5	5.2	88
Average snowy days	8.0	7.7	8.0	4.9	1.2	0	0	0	0.6	3.7	8.0	9.5	51.6
Average relative humidity (%)	68	61	51	44	44	56	68	69	64	61	64	68	60
Mean monthly sunshine hours	213.0	217.4	258.5	268.5	294.6	271.1	270.4	265.6	241.4	238.7	206.1	196.1	2,941.4
Percentage possible sunshine	72	72	69	67	65	60	59	63	65	71	71	69	67
Source: China Meteorological Administration
