= Hancun =

Hancun may refer to the following locations in China:

Towns (韩村镇)

- Hancun, Anhui, in Suixi County
- Hancun, Yongqing County, Hebei
- Hancun, Xian County, Hebei
- Hancun, Zhao County, Hebei

Townships (韩村乡)

- Hancun Township, Hebei, in Xinshi District, Baoding
- Hancun Township, Henan, in Qingfeng County
