= Xinshichang Subdistrict =

- Subdistrict

Chinese transcription(s)
- Interactive map of Xinshichang Subdistrict
- Country: China
- Province: Hebei
- Prefecture: Baoding
- District: Xinshi District
- Time zone: UTC+8 (China Standard Time)

Xinshichang Subdistrict (Chinese: 新市场街道街道) is a township-level division of Xinshi District, Baoding, Hebei, China.

== See also ==
- List of township-level divisions of Hebei
