= Fuchang Township =

Fuchang 富昌乡
- Township
- Fuchangxiang
- Location in Hebei
- Coordinates: 38°51′48.4″N 115°26′58.7″E
- Country: People's Republic of China
- Province: Hebei
- Prefecture-level city: Baoding
- District: Jingxiu District

Area
  - Total: 14.12 km^{2} (5.45 sq mi)

Population (2010)
  - Total: 23,098
  - Density: 1,636/km^{2} (4,237/sq mi)
- Time zone: UTC+8 (China Standard)
- Local dialing code: 312

Fuchang (Chinese: 富昌乡; pinyin: Fùchāng xiāng) is a township in Jingxiu District, Baoding, Hebei, China. In 2010, Fuchang had a total population of 23,098: 11,301 males and 11,797 females: 3,893 aged under 14, 17,562 aged between 15 and 65, and 1,643 aged over 65.

== See also ==
- List of township-level divisions of Hebei
