= Viette Brown Sprague =

American missionary in China

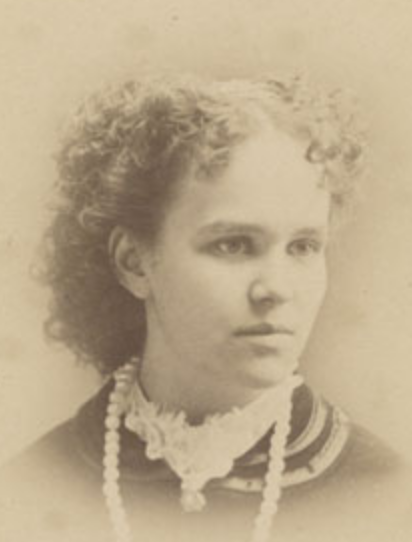
- Viette Brown Sprague as a young woman.
- Born: Viette Isabel Brown; February 12, 1846; Newark, Wayne County, New York
- Died: November 2, 1923 (aged 77); Manchester, New York
- Occupations: Educator, Christian missionary in China

Viette Brown Sprague (February 12, 1846 – November 2, 1923) was an American teaching missionary in Kalgan, China. She described her experiences during the Boxer Rebellion in a published memoir.

== Early life ==
Viette Isabel Brown was born in Newark, New York, the daughter of Hiram Leicester Brown and Hester Ann Bonker Brown. She graduated from Mount Holyoke College in 1871.

== Career ==
As a young woman, Sprague was a teacher in New York, Ohio, and Pennsylvania. After her mother died and her father remarried, she went to China, married at Tientsin, and became a missionary under the auspices of the American Board of Commissioners for Foreign Missions; in 1893, she began teaching at a mission girls' school in Kalgan, China (her husband had been there since 1874). The Spragues temporarily fled to Mongolia and were rescued by Russians in the Gobi Desert in 1900, during the unrest of the Boxer Rebellion. They were included in a list of "Foreigners Who Have Probably Been Slain" on the front page of a San Francisco newspaper published in July 1900. She wrote and published an account of her experiences, and wrote shorter items about the Kalgan mission and about anti-footbinding efforts, for American church publications.

The Spragues recovered from their ordeal in the United States, then returned to Kalgan in 1902, and stayed there until 1910. While at Kalgan, she worked with fellow American missionaries Abbie Goodrich Chapin and Mary E. Andrews on their visits from Tungzhou. After retiring to Shortsville, New York, she was active as a church worker and temperance lecturer.

== Personal life ==
Viette Brown married a widower, Christian missionary William Parmelee Sprague, in 1893. She was widowed when William Sprague died in 1919, and she died in 1923, aged 77 years, in Manchester, New York. Her papers are in the collection of Mount Holyoke College Archives and Special Collections.
