= Bao Prefecture =

Historical administrative region in Hebei, China

Baozhou or Bao Prefecture (保州), known as Baosai Prefecture (保塞軍) between 960 and 981, was a zhou (prefecture) in imperial China centering on modern Baoding, Hebei, China.

It was created in 960 by the Song dynasty and lasted until 1241, when the Mongol Empire (who conquered the Jin dynasty in 1234) abolished it.
