= Dingxing Town =

Dingxing 定兴镇
- Town
- Dingxing Zhen
- Location in Hebei Location in China
- Coordinates: 39°16′00.1″N 115°47′27.9″E
- Country: People's Republic of China
- Province: Hebei
- Prefecture-level city: Baoding
- County: Dingxing County

Area
  - Total: 65.06 km^{2} (25.12 sq mi)

Population (2010)
  - Total: 95,456
  - Density: 1,467/km^{2} (3,800/sq mi)
- Time zone: UTC+8 (China Standard)
- Area code: 312

Dingxing (Chinese: 定兴镇; pinyin: Dìngxīng Zhèn) is a town located in Dingxing County, under the jurisdiction of Baoding city in Hebei Province, China. As of the 2010 Chinese census, Dingxing had a population of 95,456 residents. The population was nearly evenly split between 48,018 males and 47,438 females. Age distribution included 14,352 individuals under 15, 74,666 between 15 and 64, and 6,438 aged 65 and over.

== See also ==
- List of township-level divisions of Hebei
