= Fuping, Hebei =

Fuping 阜平镇
- Town
- Fùpíng Zhèn
- Location in Hebei Location in China
- Coordinates: 38°50′08.6″N 114°12′13.8″E
- Country: People's Republic of China
- Province: Hebei
- Prefecture-level city: Baoding
- County: Fuping County

Area
  - Total: 271.5 km^{2} (104.8 sq mi)

Population (2010)
  - Total: 59,217
  - Density: 218.1/km^{2} (565/sq mi)
- Time zone: UTC+8 (China Standard)
- Area code: 312

Fuping (Chinese: 阜平镇; pinyin: Fùpíng Zhèn) is a town located in Fuping County, under the administration of the prefecture-level city of Baoding in Hebei Province, China. As of the 2010 Census, the town had a population of 59,217 residents living within an area of 271.5 square kilometers, resulting in a population density of approximately 218 people per square kilometer.

The gender distribution in 2010 was nearly balanced, with 49.6% male (29,347 people) and 50.4% female (29,870 people). Age-wise, 21.9% (12,955 people) were under 15 years old, 71.4% (42,268 people) were between 15 and 64 years old, and 6.7% (3,994 people) were 65 years or older.

== See also ==
- List of township-level divisions of Hebei
