= Xianfeng Subdistrict, Baoding =

Coordinates: 38.86455°N 115.45009°E

Xianfeng Subdistrict
- Subdistrict

Chinese transcription(s)
- Interactive map of Xianfeng Subdistrict
- Country: China
- Province: Hebei
- Prefecture: Baoding
- District: Xinshi District
- Time zone: UTC+8 (China Standard Time)

Xianfeng Subdistrict (Chinese: 先锋街道) is a township-level division of Xinshi District, Baoding, Hebei, China.

== See also ==
- List of township-level divisions of Hebei
