= Hancun Township, Hebei =

Hancun Township 韩村乡
- Township
- Location in Hebei
- Coordinates: 38°53′23″N 115°28′04″E
- Country: People's Republic of China
- Province: Hebei
- Prefecture-level city: Baoding
- District: Xinshi
- Village-level divisions: 9 villages
- Elevation: 22 m (72 ft)
- Time zone: UTC+8 (China Standard)
- Postal code: 071000
- Area code: 0312

Hancun Township (simplified Chinese: 韩村乡; traditional Chinese: 韓村鄉; pinyin: Háncūn Xiāng) is a township of Xinshi District, Baoding, Hebei, People's Republic of China. As of 2011, it has nine villages under its administration.

== See also ==
- List of township-level divisions of Hebei
