= Mancheng, Baoding =

Mancheng 满城区
- County
- Location in Hebei
- Coordinates: 38°56′56″N 115°19′19″E
- Country: People's Republic of China
- Province: Hebei
- Prefecture-level city: Baoding
- County seat: Huiyang Subdistrict (惠阳街道)

Area
  - Total: 734 km^{2} (283 sq mi)
- Elevation: 44 m (144 ft)

Population (2020)
  - Total: 424,000
  - Density: 578/km^{2} (1,500/sq mi)
- Time zone: UTC+8 (China Standard)
- Postal code: 072150
- Website: www.mancheng.gov.cn

Mancheng District (simplified Chinese: 满城区; traditional Chinese: 滿城區; pinyin: Mànchéng Qū) is a district of west-central Hebei province, China, in the eastern foothills of the Taihang Mountains. It is administratively part of Baoding prefecture-level city, of which the Mancheng is a northwestern suburb.

Mancheng is the site of the Han dynasty tombs of Prince Jing of Zhongshan, Liu Sheng and his wife Dou Wan.

== Administrative divisions ==
There is 1 subdistrict, 5 towns and 7 townships under the county's administration.

Subdistricts:

- Huiyang Subdistrict (惠阳街道)

Towns:

- Mancheng (满城镇), Daceying (大册营镇), Shenxing (神星镇), Nanhancun (南韩村镇), Fangshunqiao (方顺桥镇)

Townships:

- Yujiazhuang Township (于家庄乡), Xiantai Township (贤台乡), Yaozhuang Township (要庄乡), Bailong Township (白龙乡), Shijing Township (石井乡), Tuonan Township (坨南乡), Liujiatai Township (刘家台乡)

== Climate ==
Climate data for Mancheng, elevation 45 m (148 ft), (1991–2020 normals, extremes 1981–2010)
Month	Jan	Feb	Mar	Apr	May	Jun	Jul	Aug	Sep	Oct	Nov	Dec	Year
Record high °C (°F)	16.9 (62.4)	22.3 (72.1)	30.6 (87.1)	34.7 (94.5)	37.5 (99.5)	40.5 (104.9)	42.2 (108.0)	36.0 (96.8)	33.6 (92.5)	31.9 (89.4)	23.8 (74.8)	17.0 (62.6)	42.2 (108.0)
Mean daily maximum °C (°F)	2.5 (36.5)	6.6 (43.9)	13.8 (56.8)	21.2 (70.2)	27.1 (80.8)	31.3 (88.3)	31.8 (89.2)	30.2 (86.4)	26.4 (79.5)	19.7 (67.5)	10.7 (51.3)	4.0 (39.2)	18.8 (65.8)
Daily mean °C (°F)	−3.0 (26.6)	0.8 (33.4)	8.0 (46.4)	15.4 (59.7)	21.4 (70.5)	25.7 (78.3)	27.1 (80.8)	25.7 (78.3)	20.9 (69.6)	13.9 (57.0)	5.3 (41.5)	−1.1 (30.0)	13.3 (56.0)
Mean daily minimum °C (°F)	−7.5 (18.5)	−3.9 (25.0)	2.5 (36.5)	9.5 (49.1)	15.4 (59.7)	20.3 (68.5)	22.9 (73.2)	21.6 (70.9)	16.0 (60.8)	8.8 (47.8)	0.8 (33.4)	−5.3 (22.5)	8.4 (47.2)
Record low °C (°F)	−19.7 (−3.5)	−16.3 (2.7)	−9.2 (15.4)	−1.5 (29.3)	5.1 (41.2)	11.3 (52.3)	16.0 (60.8)	13.6 (56.5)	6.3 (43.3)	−3.4 (25.9)	−12.5 (9.5)	−18.9 (−2.0)	−19.7 (−3.5)
Average precipitation mm (inches)	2.2 (0.09)	5.2 (0.20)	8.4 (0.33)	24.3 (0.96)	29.3 (1.15)	67.1 (2.64)	166.6 (6.56)	136.6 (5.38)	51.8 (2.04)	25.7 (1.01)	12.0 (0.47)	2.1 (0.08)	531.3 (20.91)
Average precipitation days (≥ 0.1 mm)	1.6	2.2	2.7	5.0	6.0	9.2	12.7	11.0	7.3	5.1	3.0	1.4	67.2
Average snowy days	2.7	2.2	1.0	0.1	0	0	0	0	0	0	1.7	2.4	10.1
Average relative humidity (%)	54	50	45	48	53	60	74	78	72	66	63	57	60
Mean monthly sunshine hours	162.5	166.8	212.2	230.1	251.7	207.5	167.3	181.2	191.9	179.7	154.0	156.5	2,261.4
Percentage possible sunshine	53	55	57	58	57	47	37	43	52	53	52	54	52
Source: China Meteorological Administration
