= Jingxiu, Baoding =

Jingxiu District 竞秀区
- District
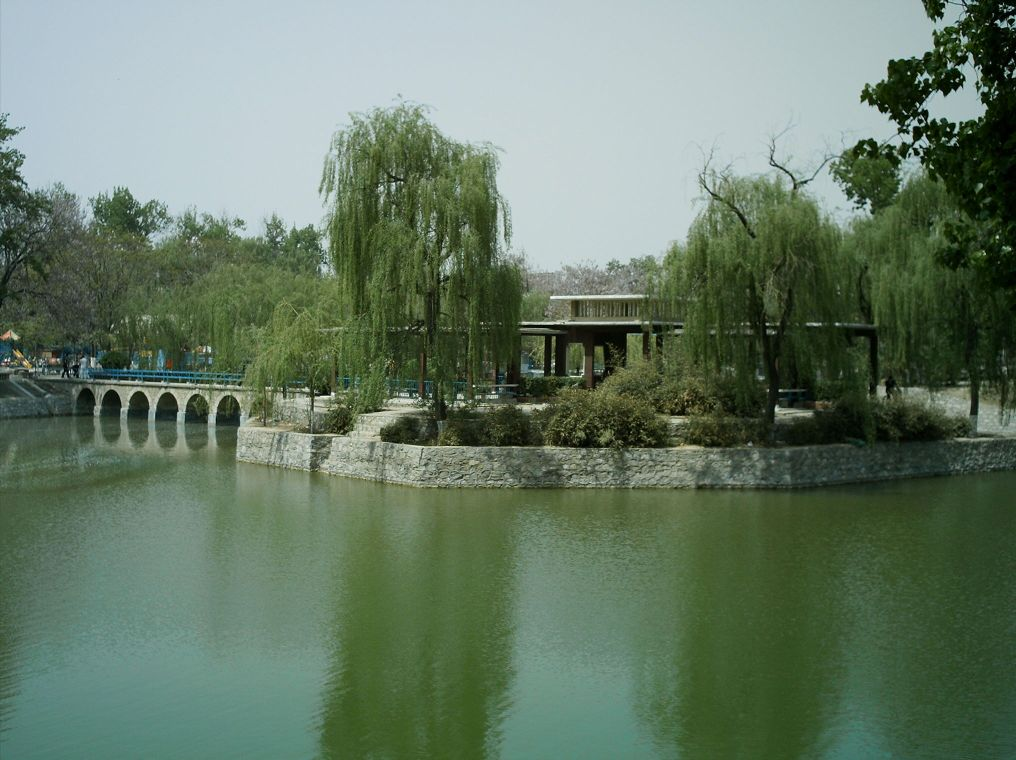
- A park within the district

- Location in Hebei
- Country: China
- Province: Hebei
- Prefecture-level city: Baoding
- District seat: Xianfeng Subdistrict

Area
  - Total: 122 km^{2} (47 sq mi)

Population (2020 census)
  - Total: 522,813
  - Density: 4,290/km^{2} (11,100/sq mi)
- Time zone: UTC+8 (China Standard)
- Website: www.jingxiu.gov.cn

Jingxiu District (simplified Chinese: 竞秀区; traditional Chinese: 竞秀區; pinyin: Jìngxiù Qū) is a district of Baoding, Hebei, China. Before 2015 May, the district was known as Xinshi District (新市区; 新市區; Xīnshì Qū).

== Administrative divisions ==
Jingxiu District is divided into 5 subdistricts, 2 towns and 4 townships.

5 subdistricts are: Xianfeng Subdistrict, Xinshichang Subdistrict, Dongfenglu Subdistrict (东风路街道), Jiannan Subdistrict (建南街道), North Hancun Road Subdistrict (韩村北路街道).

The only town is Dajidian Town (大激店镇).

4 townships are: Jiezhuang Township (颉庄乡), Fuchang Township (富昌乡), Hancun Township, Nanqi Township (南奇乡).
