= Abbie Goodrich Chapin =

American missionary

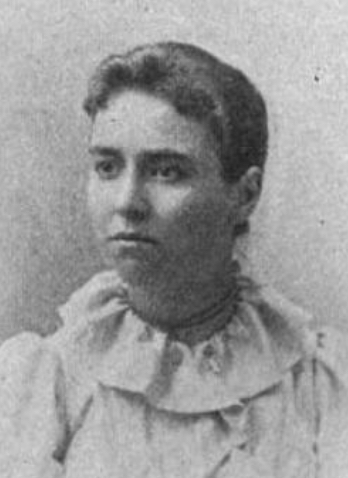
- Abbie G. Chapin, from a 1901 publication.
- Born: April 2, 1868; Tongzhou, China
- Died: July 24, 1956 (aged 88); Glendale, California
- Occupation: Missionary

Abbie Goodrich Chapin RRC (April 2, 1868 – July 24, 1956) was an American missionary in China. In 1901 she became the first American decorated with the Royal Red Cross, for services rendered at Peking's International Hospital during the Boxer Rebellion.

== Early life and education ==
Abbie Goodrich Chapin was born in Tongzhou, China, the daughter of Lyman Dwight Chapin and Clara Labaree Evans Chapin. Her parents were American missionaries in China; her father was an ordained minister, and her mother was a teacher. Her brothers Dwight and Edward were also a missionaries in China; both were ordained Presbyterian ministers.

Chapin graduated from the University of Southern California in 1892 (her older sister Louise (Lula) graduated from USC the previous year), receiving a bachelor of philosophy from the school's College of Liberal Arts.

== Career ==
Under the American Board of Commissioners for Foreign Missions, Chapin taught at the Mary Morrill School for Women in Paotingfu, and at Tongzhou. Her work was funded in part by Christian Endeavor societies. In 1900, she was in Beijing, and listed among "Foreigners Who Have Probably Been Slain" in a San Francisco newspaper, after she was captured in the Boxer Rebellion. She and the other missionaries in her group were confirmed alive about six weeks later. In 1901, she was one of four women decorated by King Edward VII with the Royal Red Cross, for services rendered at Beijing's international hospital, the first American so honored.

She visited her siblings in the United States and spoke to American church groups in 1905, 1913, 1921, 1931, and 1932. In 1937, she was again in peril, as one of several Americans sheltering from Japanese bombings and caring for wounded soldiers at the Presbyterian Hospital in Paotingfu.

== Personal life ==
Chapin worked and lived for most of her life with Mary E. Andrews (also seen as Mary E. Andrus), a fellow American teaching missionary. Andrews died at Paotingfu in 1936. Chapin died in Glendale, California in 1956, aged 88 years.
