= Diaoyutai Site =

Archaeological site in China

Diaoyutai
- 钓鱼台遗址 (Japanese)
- location in China
- 38.57828°N 114.63955°E
- Periods: Neolithic China
- Cultures: Yangshao culture
- Location: Hebei
- Region: North China Plain

Diaoyutai (釣魚臺遺址; 钓鱼台遗址; Diàoyútái Yízhǐ) is a Neolithic site in Quyang County, Hebei province, China. It is a 5,000-year-old site dating back to the time of the Yangshao culture.

The Diaoyutai site has been considered a major cultural heritage site under national-level protection since 2006.
