= Baoding =

Prefecture-level city in Hebei, China

Baoding 保定市 Paoting
- Prefecture-level city
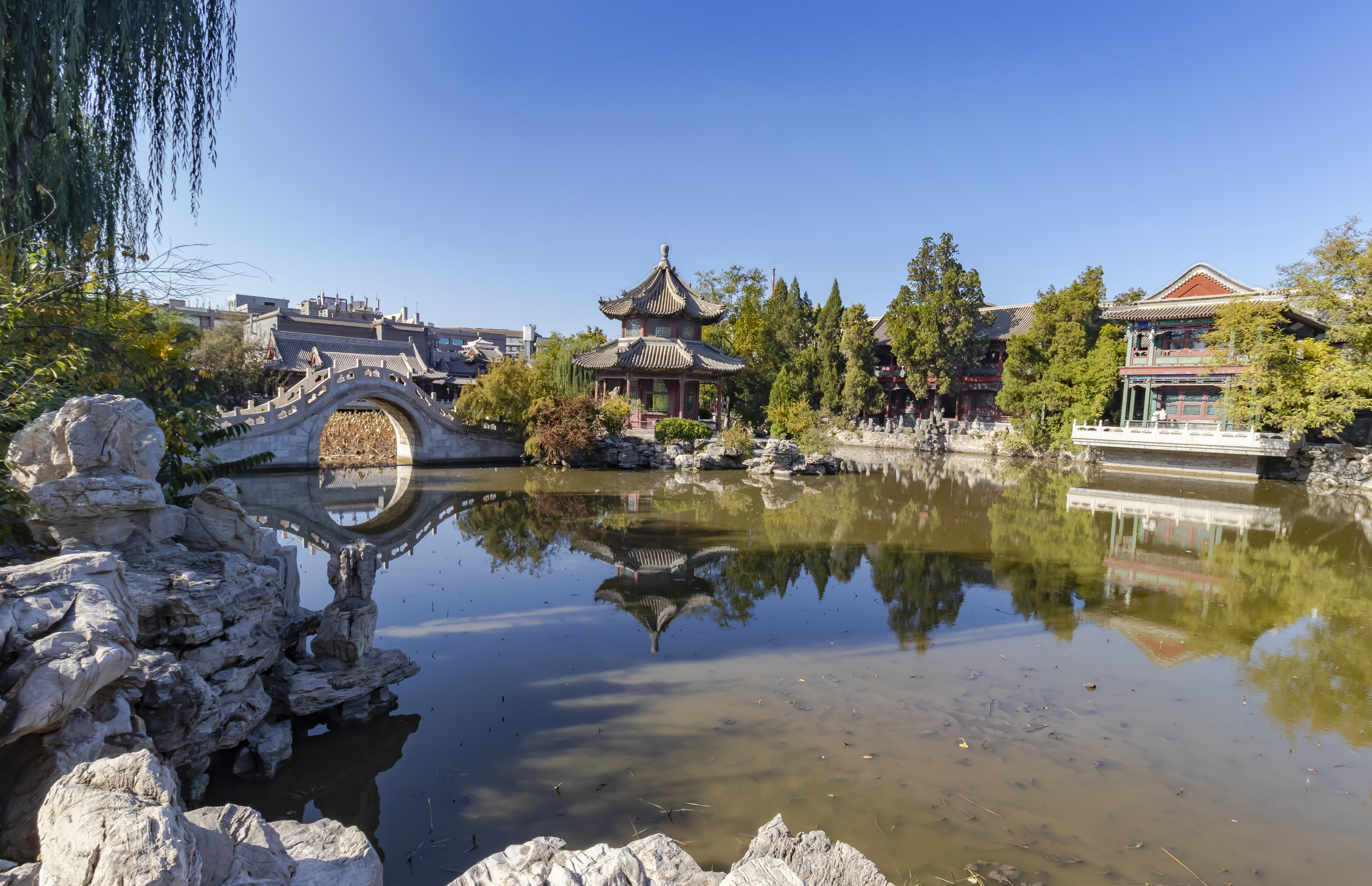
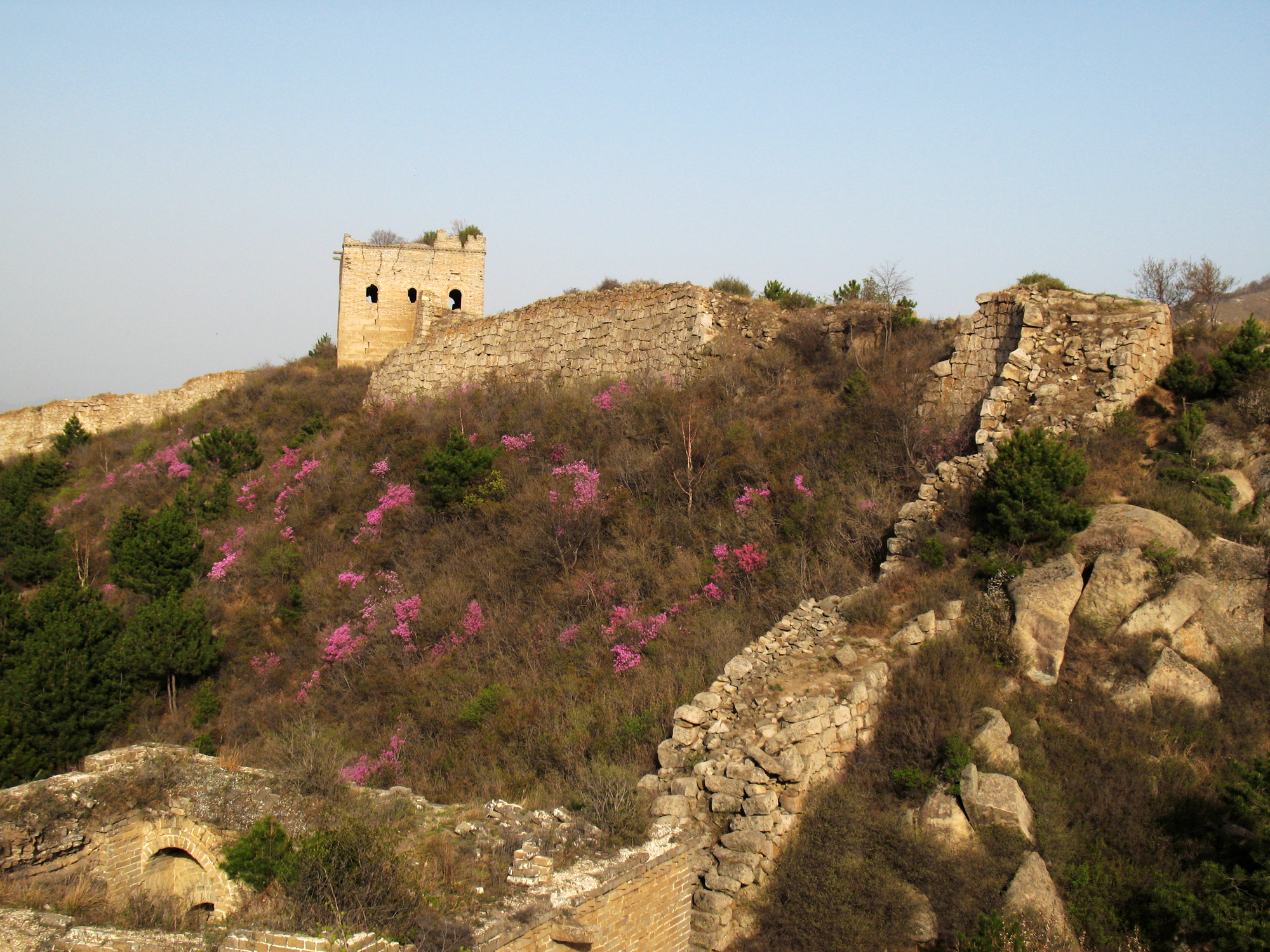
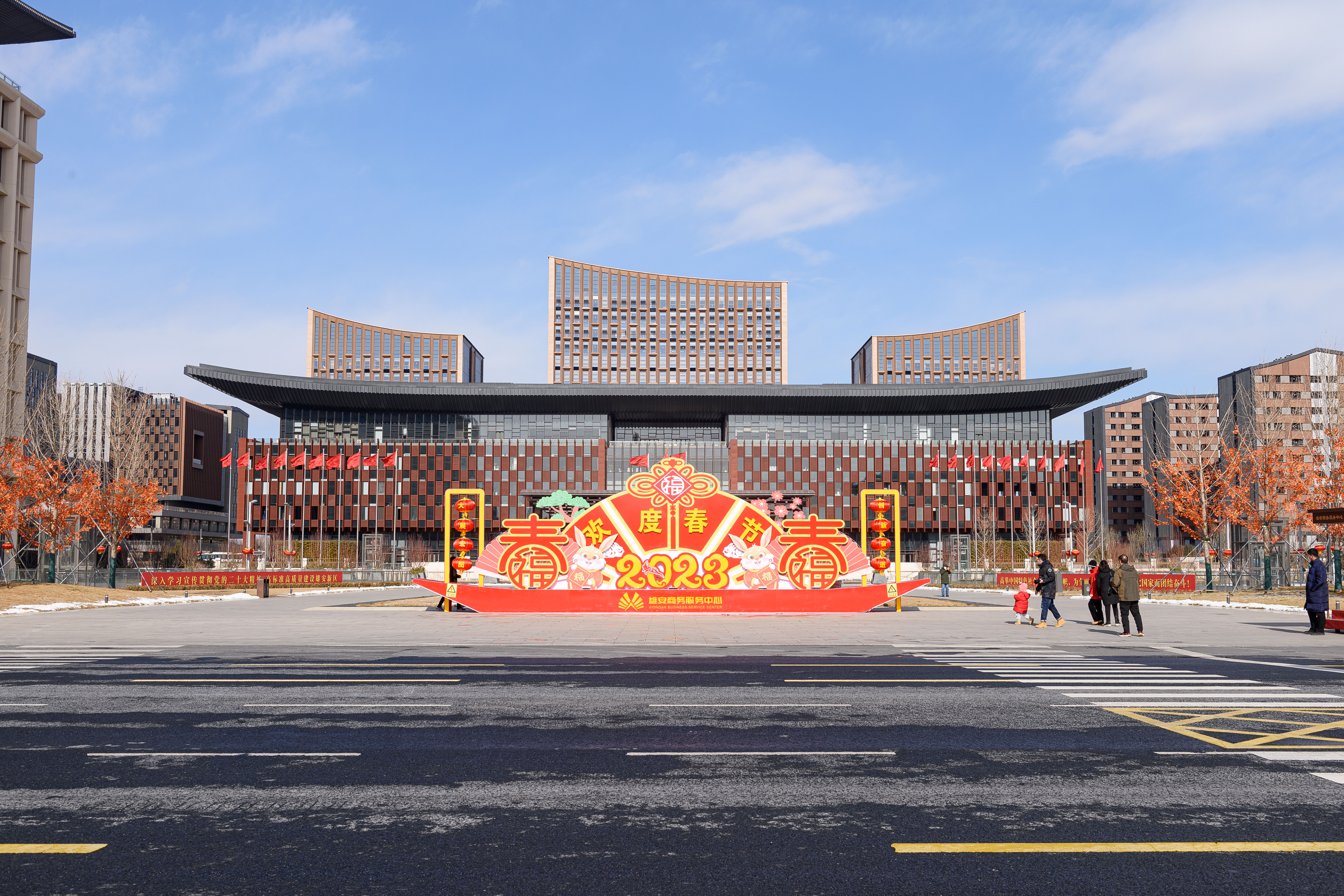
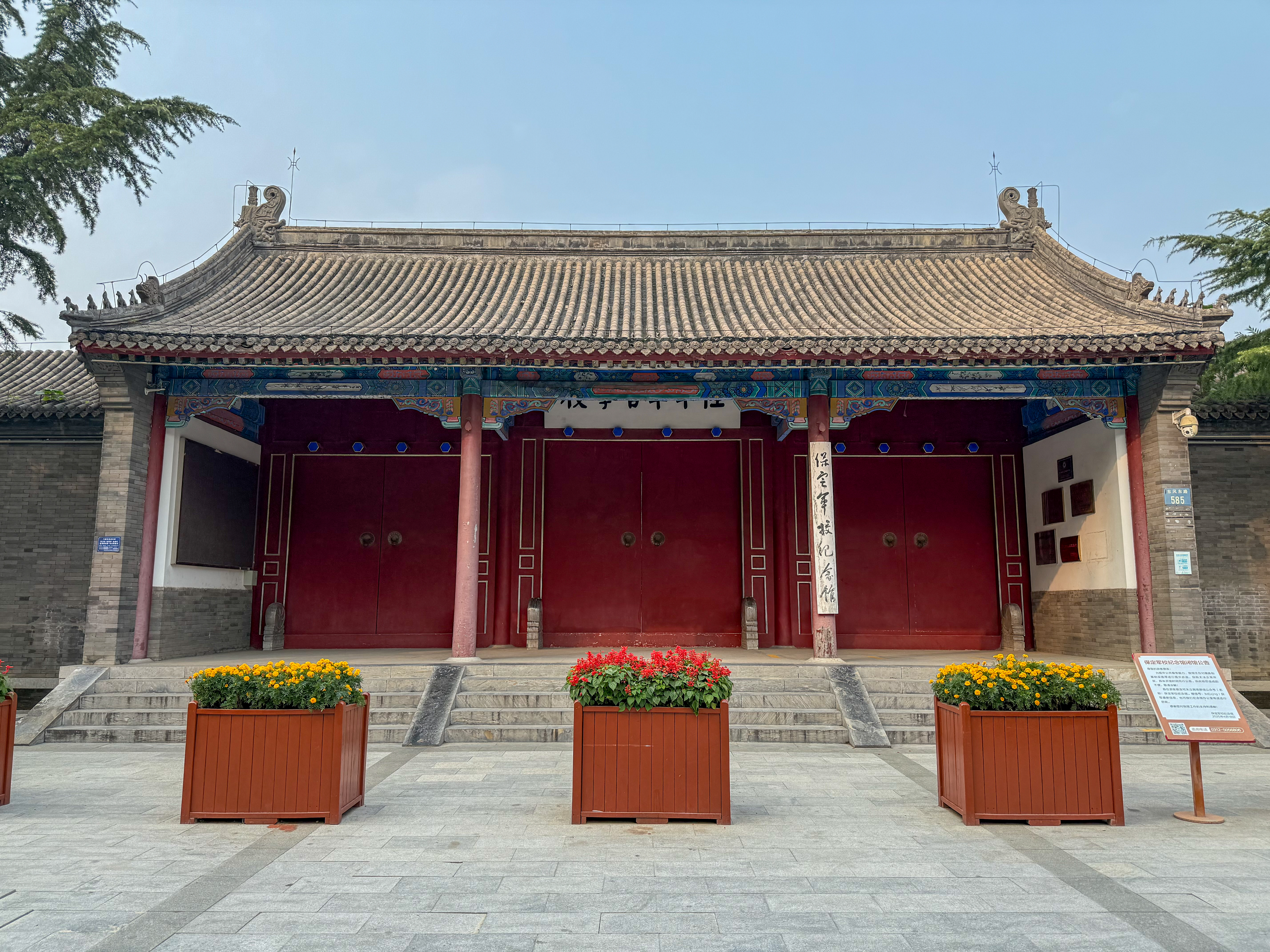
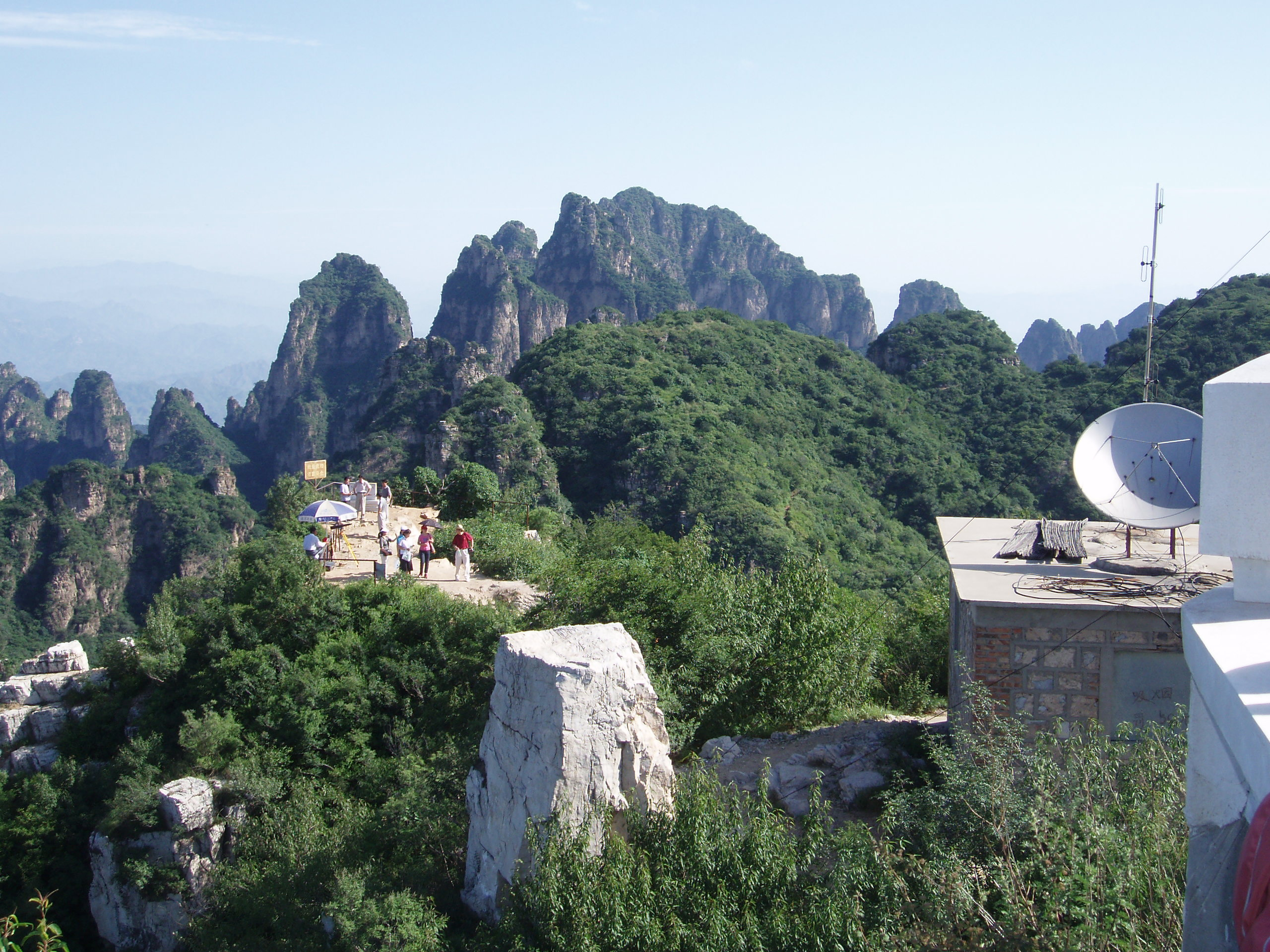
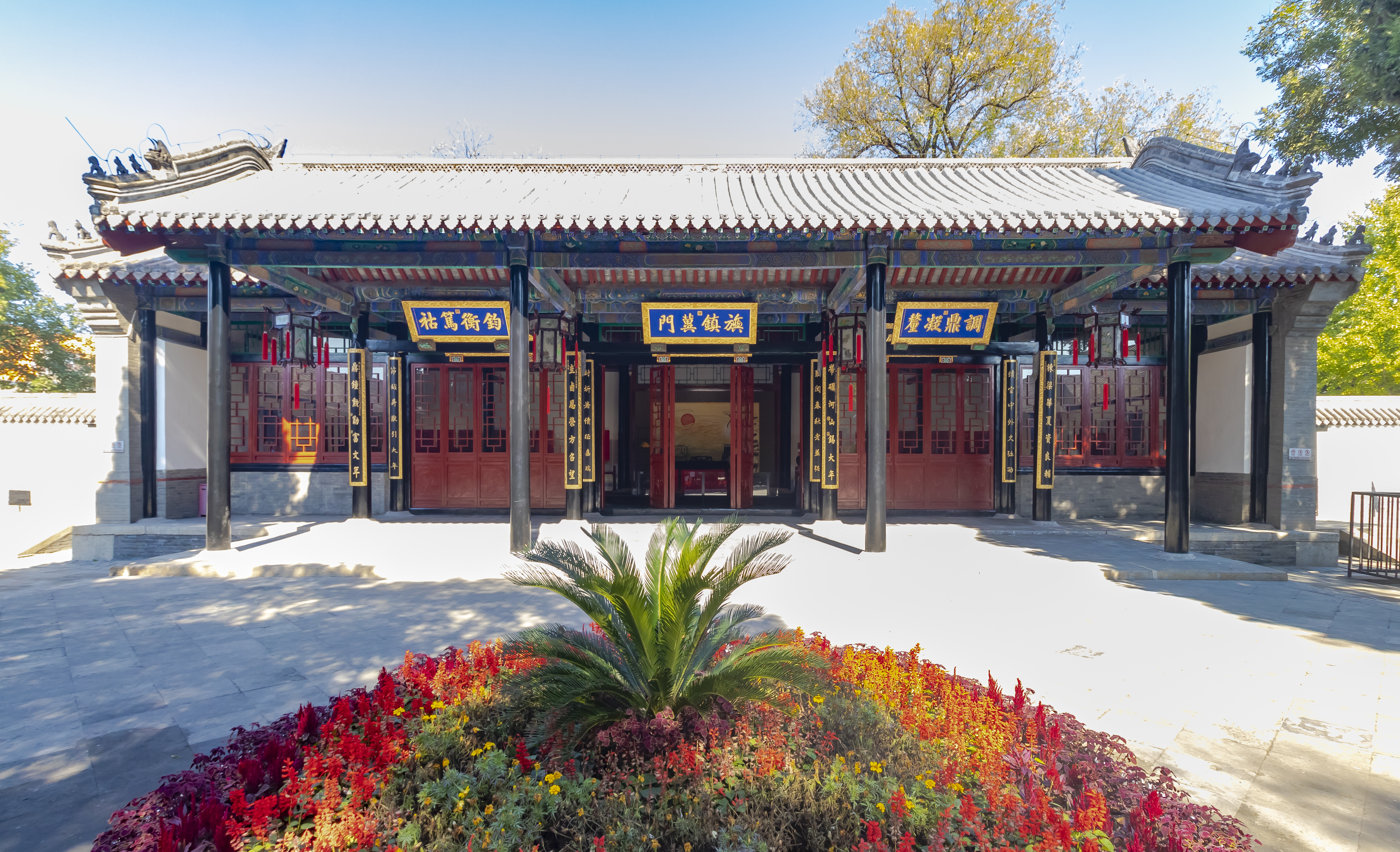
- Ancient Lotus Pool The Great Wall Xiong'an Baoding Military Academy Mount Langya Former Zhili Governor's Office
- Nickname: Boot-Shaped City (靴城)
- Interactive map of Baoding
- Location of the city centre in Hebei Baoding (Northern China) Baoding (China)
- Coordinates (Baoding municipal government): 38°52′26″N 115°27′50″E
- Country: People's Republic of China
- Province: Hebei
- County-level divisions: 5 districts 4 county-level cities 15 counties
- Township-level divisions: 28 subdistricts 142 towns 170 townships 3 ethnic townships
- Settled: 477
- Established: 1925
- Municipal seat: Jingxiu District

Government
  - Type: Prefecture level city
  - Body: Baoding City People's Congress

Area
  - Prefecture-level city: 22,185 km^{2} (8,566 sq mi)
  - Urban: 326 km^{2} (126 sq mi)
  - Metro: 1,840 km^{2} (710 sq mi)
- Elevation: 25 m (82 ft)
- Highest elevation: 2,286 m (7,500 ft)
- Lowest elevation: 7 m (23 ft)

Population (2020 census)
  - Prefecture-level city: 11,544,036
  - Density: 520.35/km^{2} (1,347.7/sq mi)
  - Urban: 6,425,944
  - Urban density: 19,700/km^{2} (51,100/sq mi)
  - Metro: 2,549,787
  - Metro density: 1,390/km^{2} (3,590/sq mi)

GDP
  - Prefecture-level city: CN¥ 408.7 billion US$ 52.9 billion
  - Per capita: CN¥ 28,648; US$4,600
- Time zone: UTC+8 (China Standard)
- Postal code: 071000
- Area code: 0312
- ISO 3166 code: CN-HE-06
- License plate prefixes: 冀F
- Website: www.baoding.gov.cn

Baoding
- Chinese: 保定
- Literal meaning: "protect (the capital) and stabilize (the territory)"
Transcriptions
Standard Mandarin
- Hanyu Pinyin: Bǎodìng
- Wade–Giles: Pao^{2}-ting^{1}
- IPA: [pàʊtîŋ]
Yue: Cantonese
- Yale Romanization: bou2 ding6
- Jyutping: Bou-ding
- IPA: [pɔw˧˥tɪŋ˨]

Baoding is a prefecture-level city in central Hebei province, approximately 150 kilometres (93 mi) southwest of Beijing. As of the 2020 census, Baoding City had 11,544,036 inhabitants, of which 2,549,787 lived in the metropolitan area made of 4 out of 5 urban districts: Lianchi, Jingxiu, Qingyuan, and Mancheng all of which are largely conurbated. Accounting for about one-sixth of the population of Hebei Province. At the end of 2024, the city's resident population is 9,046,200, of which the urban resident population is 5,527,200. Baoding is among 13 Chinese cities with a population of over 10 million, ranking seventh. Zhuozhou City in the northern part has now grown into part of the Beijing metro area.

Baoding was the capital of Zhili Province and the residence of the Viceroy of Zhili in the Qing dynasty. The city was also the capital of Hebei province until 1968, and is now a national historical and cultural city and one of the central cities in the Jing-Jin-Ji cluster, with the Xiong'an new area located within its jurisdiction.

== Name ==
Baoding was known as Shanggu, Baozhou, Shoocheng and Baofu in ancient times. The city's name, Baoding (Chinese: 保定), dates back to the Song and Yuan dynasties, In 1239, the Yuan Dynasty changed the name of Shuntian Army to Shuntian Road, which means "complying with the destiny of heaven", and Baozhou was renamed Luzhi (路治). Because Baozhou was the southern gate of the capital in the Yuan Dynasty, Shuntian Road was changed to Baoding Road in 1275, which means "defend the capital and stabilize the world". The name is roughly interpreted as "protecting the capital", referring to the city's proximity to Beijing.

== History ==
Baoding has a history dating back to the Western Han Dynasty.

=== Prehistory ===
The Nanzhuangtou site near Baiyang Lake is one of the earliest Neolithic site discovered in North China, dating back approximately 10,500–9,700 years. Other Neolithic sites in Baoding include Diaoyutai and Beifudi.

=== Early history ===
During the Warring States period, what is now Baoding was along the dividing line between the Yan and Zhao states.

One of the capitals of Yan during this period, Xiadu, is located in what is now Yi County, and from 400 to 300 BC may have been the largest cities in the world, with an estimated population of over 300,000.

=== Imperial era ===
In 960 the Song dynasty established the Bao prefecture ("Baozhou") with the administrative office in Baosai County (modern Baoding). This lasted until 1241, when the Mongol Empire (who conquered the Jin dynasty in 1234) abolished it, incorporating Baozhou into the Central Region.

In the year 1213 the Mongol army invaded and destroyed Baozhou, leaving it in ruins until it was reconstructed in 1227 during the Yuan dynasty. The region acquired the name "Baoding" in 1275.

In 1669, Baoding became the capital of Zhili, ruled over by a Viceroy until the fall of the Qing dynasty in 1912.

In 1902, Yuan Shikai, then Viceroy, established the Baoding Military Academy. Birthplace of many famous ROC and Communist generals in the early 20th century.

=== Contemporary history ===
On August 1, 1949, the People's Government of Hebei province was established, Baoding was the capital of the province, and the city of Baoding was a provincial municipality. On August 9, the administrative inspector's office of the Baoding district was established, and it was established as the administrative inspector's office of the county district.

In May 1958, the capital of Hebei was moved to Tianjin, then back to Baoding in January 1966, to Shijiazhuang in February 1968. In December 1994, the Baoding area merged with Baoding to become a provincial city.

In April 2017, the Central Committee of the Chinese Communist Party and the State Council announced the decision to transform Baoding's Xiong, Rongcheng, and Anxin counties into Xiong'an New Area, a new development area of national significance, with a focus on innovation, sustainability and quality of life, following the successes of Shenzhen Special Economic Zone and Shanghai's Pudong New Area.

== Geography ==
Baoding is located in the west-central portion of Hebei province and lies on the North China Plain, with the Taihang Mountains to the west. Bordering prefecture-level cities in the province are Zhangjiakou to the north, Langfang and Cangzhou to the east, and Shijiazhuang and Hengshui to the south. Baoding also borders Beijing to the northeast and Shanxi to the west.

The geographical coordinates of Baoding are between 113°40'-116°20' east longitude and 38°10'-40°00' north latitude.

Elevations in Baoding's administrative area decrease from northwest to southeast. The western parts are dominated by mountains and hills that are generally more than 1,000 metres (3,300 ft) tall; this area includes parts of Laishui, Yi, Mancheng, Shunping, Tang, and Fuping Counties as well as the entirety of Laiyuan County, occupying 30.6% of the prefecture's area. The highest peak is Mount Waitou (歪头山), with an elevation of 2,286 metres (7,500 ft). Moving southeast from this area, one encounters low-lying mountains and hills, taking up 18.9% of the prefecture's area. Further to the east lies generally flat terrain of 30 to 100 metres (98 to 330 ft) elevation. Here the primary rivers are the Xiaoyi River (孝义河), Fu River (府河), Bao River (瀑河), Ping River (萍河), Juma River (拒马河), Yishui River (易水河), Tang River (唐河), Cao River (漕河), Zhulong River (潴龙河), Qingshui River (清水河), and Sha River (沙河). Baiyangdian Lake, the largest natural lake in northern China, can be found nearby.

=== Climate ===
Baoding has a continental, monsoon-influenced humid continental climate/semi-arid climate (Köppen Dwa/BSk), characterised by hot, humid summers due to the East Asian monsoon, and generally cold, windy, very dry winters that reflect the influence of the vast Siberian anticyclone. Spring can bear witness to sandstorms blowing in from the Mongolian steppe, accompanied by rapidly warming, but generally dry, conditions. Autumn is similar to spring in temperature and lack of rainfall. The annual rainfall, about 60% of which falls in July and August alone, is highly variable and not reliable. The average annual runoff is 2.45 billion cubic meters. In the city itself, this amount has averaged to a meagre 496.1 millimetres (19.5 in) per annum. The monthly 24-hour average temperature ranges from −2.7 °C (27.1 °F) in January to 27.1 °C (80.8 °F) in July, and the annual mean is 13.3 °C (55.9 °F). There are 2,500 to 2,900 hours of bright sunshine annually, and the frost-free period lasts 165−210 days.

Climate data for Baoding, elevation 17 m (56 ft), (1991–2020 normals, extremes 1971–present)
Month	Jan	Feb	Mar	Apr	May	Jun	Jul	Aug	Sep	Oct	Nov	Dec	Year
Record high °C (°F)	17.5 (63.5)	23.1 (73.6)	30.7 (87.3)	33.8 (92.8)	38.1 (100.6)	41.9 (107.4)	41.6 (106.9)	37.7 (99.9)	34.3 (93.7)	31.1 (88.0)	23.9 (75.0)	17.4 (63.3)	41.9 (107.4)
Mean daily maximum °C (°F)	2.7 (36.9)	6.9 (44.4)	14.1 (57.4)	21.5 (70.7)	27.4 (81.3)	31.7 (89.1)	32.2 (90.0)	30.6 (87.1)	26.7 (80.1)	20.0 (68.0)	10.7 (51.3)	4.1 (39.4)	19.0 (66.3)
Daily mean °C (°F)	−2.8 (27.0)	0.9 (33.6)	7.8 (46.0)	15.1 (59.2)	21.1 (70.0)	25.7 (78.3)	27.3 (81.1)	25.8 (78.4)	20.9 (69.6)	13.8 (56.8)	5.2 (41.4)	−1.0 (30.2)	13.3 (56.0)
Mean daily minimum °C (°F)	−7.2 (19.0)	−3.8 (25.2)	2.2 (36.0)	9.2 (48.6)	15.0 (59.0)	20.2 (68.4)	23.0 (73.4)	21.8 (71.2)	16.1 (61.0)	8.9 (48.0)	1.0 (33.8)	−4.9 (23.2)	8.5 (47.2)
Record low °C (°F)	−22.0 (−7.6)	−15.7 (3.7)	−14.8 (5.4)	−3.2 (26.2)	5.5 (41.9)	9.7 (49.5)	13.4 (56.1)	12.6 (54.7)	5.7 (42.3)	−2.3 (27.9)	−11.6 (11.1)	−23.3 (−9.9)	−23.3 (−9.9)
Average precipitation mm (inches)	2.2 (0.09)	5.0 (0.20)	8.9 (0.35)	24.1 (0.95)	33.8 (1.33)	68.1 (2.68)	153.0 (6.02)	108.5 (4.27)	54.5 (2.15)	24.2 (0.95)	12.2 (0.48)	2.0 (0.08)	496.5 (19.55)
Average precipitation days (≥ 0.1 mm)	1.5	2.2	2.9	4.7	6.2	8.4	11.8	11.0	6.7	4.8	3.3	1.3	64.8
Average snowy days	3.0	2.3	0.9	0.2	0	0	0	0	0	0	1.6	2.9	10.9
Average relative humidity (%)	55	50	47	51	55	59	72	77	71	66	65	59	61
Mean monthly sunshine hours	143.9	156.4	206.7	225.9	251.7	209.8	174.7	179.9	183.4	171.4	140.0	137.3	2,181.1
Percentage possible sunshine	47	51	55	57	57	47	39	43	50	50	47	47	49
Source 1: China Meteorological Administration all-time extreme temperatureAll-time June low
Source 2: Weather China

== Administrative divisions ==
Bǎodìng prefecture-level city consists of 5 municipal districts, 4 county-level cities, 15 counties:

Map
Division code	English name	Simp. Chinese	Pinyin	Area in km^{2}	Seat	Postal code	Divisions					
Division code	English name	Simp. Chinese	Pinyin	Area in km^{2}	Seat	Postal code	Subdistricts	Towns	Townships	Ethnic townships	Residential communities (居委会)	Villages (村委会)
130600	Baoding	保定市	Bǎodìng Shì	22185	Jingxiu District	071000	31	207	105	2	514	6184
130602	Jingxiu District	竞秀区	Jìngxiù Qū	149	Xianfeng Subdistrict (先锋街道)	071000	5	2	4		81	71
130603	Lianchi District	莲池区	Liánchí Qū	82	Wusi Road Subdistrict (五四路街道)	071000	10	2	5		151	120
130605	Mancheng District	满城区	Mǎnchéng Qū	658	Mancheng Town (满城镇)	072100	1	6	6		16	183
130606	Qingyuan District	清苑区	Qīngyuàn Qū	856	Qingyuan (清苑镇)	071100		13	5		14	266
130607	Xushui District	徐水区	Xúshuǐ Qū	723	Ansu (安肃镇)	072500		10	4		28	304
130633	Yi County	易县	Yì Xiàn	2535	Yizhou (易州镇)	074200		11	16	1	10	469
130630	Laiyuan County	涞源县	Láiyuán Xiàn	2431	Laiyuan (涞源镇)	074300		10	7		8	283
130626	Dingxing County	定兴县	Dìngxīng Xiàn	714	Dingxing (定兴镇)	072600		9	7		23	274
130636	Shunping County	顺平县	Shùnpíng Xiàn	712	Puyang (蒲阳镇)	072200		6	4		4	237
130627	Tang County	唐县	Táng Xiàn	1414	Renhou (仁厚镇)	072300		11	9		8	345
130631	Wangdu County	望都县	Wàngdū Xiàn	358	Wangdu (望都镇)	072400		7	1		10	142
130623	Laishui County	涞水县	Láishuǐ Xiàn	1662	Laishui (涞水镇)	074100		12	3		6	284
130628	Gaoyang County	高阳县	Gāoyáng Xiàn	496	Gaoyang (高阳镇)	071500		1	7		11	149
130632	Anxin County	安新县	Ānxīn Xiàn	728	Anxin (安新镇)	071600		9	4		5	223
130638	Xiong County	雄县	Xióng Xiàn	513	Xiongzhou (雄州镇)	071800		8	4		7	287
130629	Rongcheng County	容城县	Róngchéng Xiàn	311	Rongcheng (容城镇)	071700		5	3		4	127
130634	Quyang County	曲阳县	Qūyáng Xiàn	1076	Hengzhou (恒州镇)	073100		11	16		10	367
130624	Fuping County	阜平县	Fùpíng Xiàn	2494	Fuping (阜平镇)	073200		8	5		5	209
130637	Boye County	博野县	Bóyě Xiàn	331	Boye (博野镇)	071300		7			11	133
130635	Li County	蠡县	Lǐ Xiàn	653	Liwu (蠡吾镇)	071400		11	2		7	232
130682	Dingzhou City	定州市	Dìngzhōu Shì	1284	Nanchengqu Subdistrict (南城区街道)	073000	4	16	5	1	31	470
130681	Zhuozhou City	涿州市	Zhuōzhōu Shì	751	Shuangta Subdistrict (双塔街道)	072700	3	10	1		39	402
130683	Anguo City	安国市	Ānguó Shì	485	Qizhouyaoshi Subdistrict (祁州药市街道)	071200	2	6	3		6	198
130684	Gaobeidian City	高碑店市	Gāobēidiàn Shì	674	Xinghua Road Subdistrict (兴华路街道)	074000	5	10			19	409
	Xiong'an New Area	雄安新区	Xióng'ān Xīnqū	106.46	Rongcheng (容城镇)							
Note: Baoding New High Technology Product Development Zone (保定高新技术产业开发区) includes Damafang Township (大马坊乡) of Jingxiu District and Jiantai Township (贤台乡) of Mancheng District; the Baigou New City (白沟新城) includes Baigou Town (白沟镇) of Gaobeidian City.

- Dissolved districts: Beishi District and Nanshi District

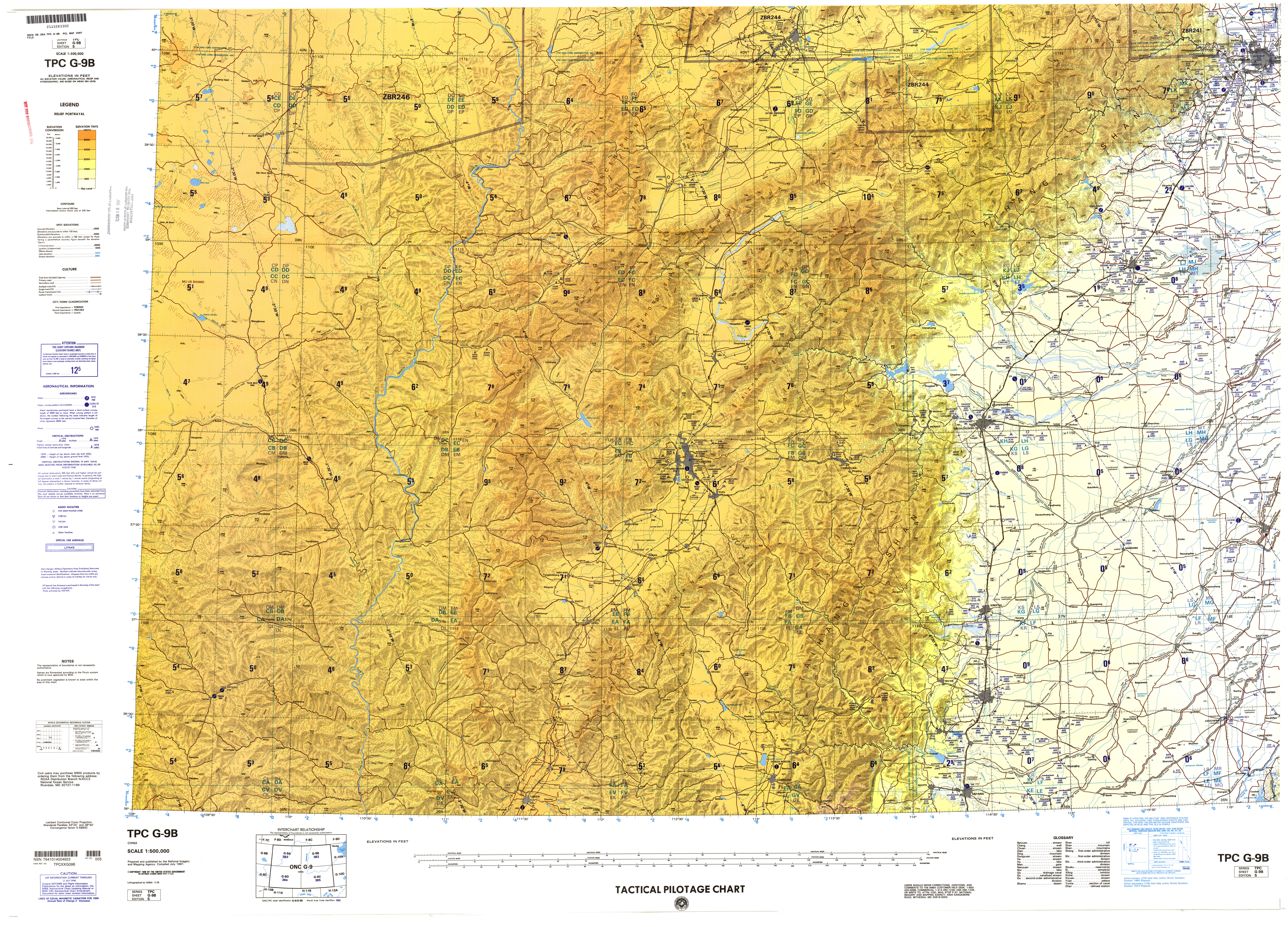
Map including Baoding and surrounding region (NIMA, 1998)

== Demographics ==
Baoding City Demographics
Division name
Division name	Residence population (November 2010)			Hukou population (end of 2010)
Division name	Total	Ratio (%)	Population density (persons/km^{2})	Hukou population (end of 2010)
Baoding City	11,194,379	100	504.55	11610199
Xinshi District	482,768	4.31	2540.88	459038
Beishi District	387,339	3.46	5164.52	322205
Nanshi District	287,784	2.57	2877.84	279725
Mancheng District	387,307	3.46	615.75	411417
Qingyuan District	631,659	5.64	728.56	648645
Laishui County	339,063	3.03	204.50	352993
Fuping County	205,299	1.83	82.28	223846
Xushui County	563,030	5.03	778.74	586104
Dingxing County	517,873	4.63	725.31	585913
Tang County	529,066	4.73	373.37	590575
Gaoyang County	345,160	3.08	695.89	340163
Rongcheng County	258,179	2.31	822.23	265389
Laiyuan County	260,678	2.33	106.49	283537
Wangdu County	250,014	2.23	781.29	265525
Anxin County	437,378	3.91	604.11	440817
Yi County	537,564	4.80	212.14	570806
Quyang County	588,559	5.26	542.95	610065
Li County	505,574	4.52	775.42	532322
Shunping County	295,764	2.64	417.75	317484
Boye County	245,504	2.19	741.70	268941
Xiong County	359,506	3.21	686.08	375470
Zhuozhou City	603,535	5.39	813.39	645542
Dingzhou City	1,165,182	10.41	914.59	1214852
Anguo City	370,314	3.31	761.96	409834
Gaobeidian City	640,280	5.72	938.83	608991
Note: The 58,709 people residing in Baoding High Technology Product Development Zone and the 124,274 in the Baigou New City are not listed separately.

According to the 2010 Census, the residence population stood at 11,194,382, an increase of 605,100 (5.71%) from 2000. The male-female ratio was 101.94:100. Children aged up to 14 numbered 1,915,800 (17.11% of the population), citizens 15 to 64 numbered 8,370,600 (74.78%), and 65+ numbered 908,000 (8.11%). The urban area of Baoding made of 5 urban Districts had a population of around 2,739,887 (2010 census). The overwhelming majority of the population is Han Chinese. The language of Baoding is Mandarin Chinese — specifically, the Baoding dialect of Ji-Lu Mandarin. Despite Baoding's proximity to Beijing, the Chinese spoken in Baoding is not particularly close to the Beijing dialect — rather, it is more closely related to Tianjin dialect.

== Economy ==
Baoding is located in the centre of the Bohai Rim economic area which includes Beijing, Tianjin, and Shijiazhuang. One of the largest employers in Baoding is China Lucky Film, the largest photosensitive materials and magnetic recording media manufacturer in China. And, Yingli group, 2010 World Cup sponsor, has its headquarters in Baoding, who is the Global Top 10 solar panel manufacturer. More renowned companies include ZhongHang HuiTeng Windpower Equipment Co., Ltd (Wind Turbine), Baoding Tianwei Group Co., Ltd (Transformer), and Great Wall Motor.

In April 2017, an area in Baoding was designated as a Xiong'an New Area, a development zone of initially 100 km^{2} and up to 2000 km^{2}, the site of what will eventually be a new city and the hub of the Beijing-Tinajin-Hebei development area.

- Baoding High-tech Industrial Development Zone

Great Wall Motors Company Limited is a Chinese automobile manufacturer headquartered in Baoding, Hebei, China. The company is named after the Great Wall of China and was formed in 1984. It is China's largest sport utility vehicle (SUV) and pick-up truck producer. It sells passenger cars and trucks under the Great Wall brand and SUVs under the Haval and WEY brands.

In 2016, Great Wall Motors set a historical sales record of 1,074,471 cars worldwide, increased by 26% compared to 2015.

== Renewable energy ==
Baoding City has one of China's biggest plants which manufactures blades used in wind turbine generators, catering mainly to the domestic market. Tianwei Wind Power Technology is one of the three main plants in Baoding that produces wind turbine generators. It wheeled out its first 20 turbines in 2008, and it will produce 150 units in 2009 and another 500 in 2010. Nevertheless, Baoding is currently listed as the most polluted city in China.

== Transport ==
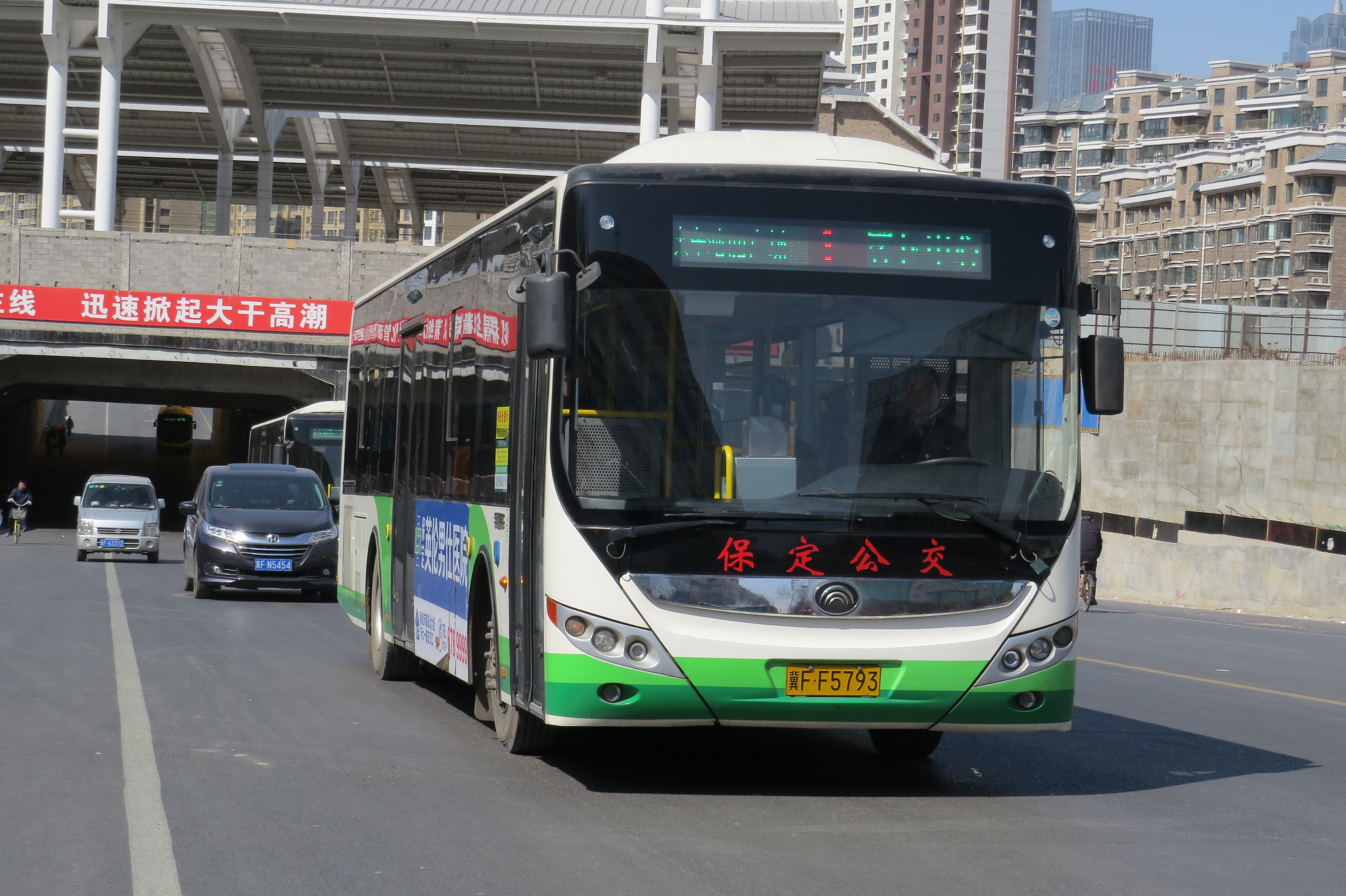
Bus line 1 near Baoding Railway Station

Baoding has good connections to other cities, being located on one of the main routes in and out of Beijing.

=== Road ===
The Jingshi Expressway connects the two cities, and Baoding is also the western terminus of the Baojin Expressway linking Baoding with Tianjin, which is one out of two nearest ports (Huanghua is the other one).

=== Rail ===
The Jingguang Railway provides frequent services to Beijing West railway station. On 30 December 2012, a new Baoding station was opened, while the old train station was closed for passengers. Baoding East railway station lies 9.5 km (5.9 mi) to the east on the Beijing–Guangzhou–Shenzhen–Hong Kong high-speed railway. On October 1, 2018, the east square of Baoding Railway Station was officially put into use, and the east station building of the railway station was also opened at the same time.

== Military ==
Baoding is headquarters of the 38th Mechanized Group Army of the People's Liberation Army, one of the three group armies that comprise the Beijing Military Region responsible for defending the PRC capital.

== Culture ==
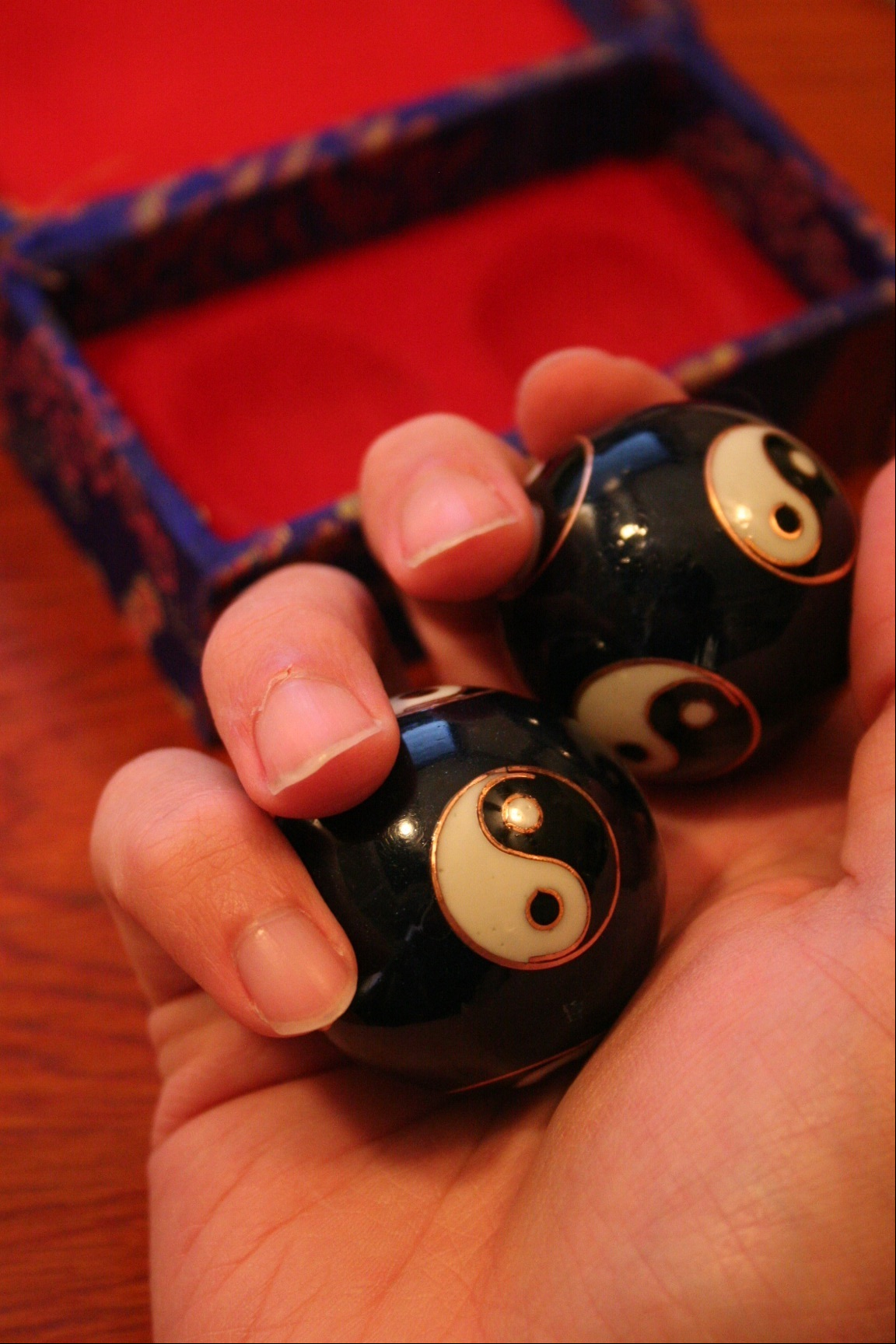
Baoding balls

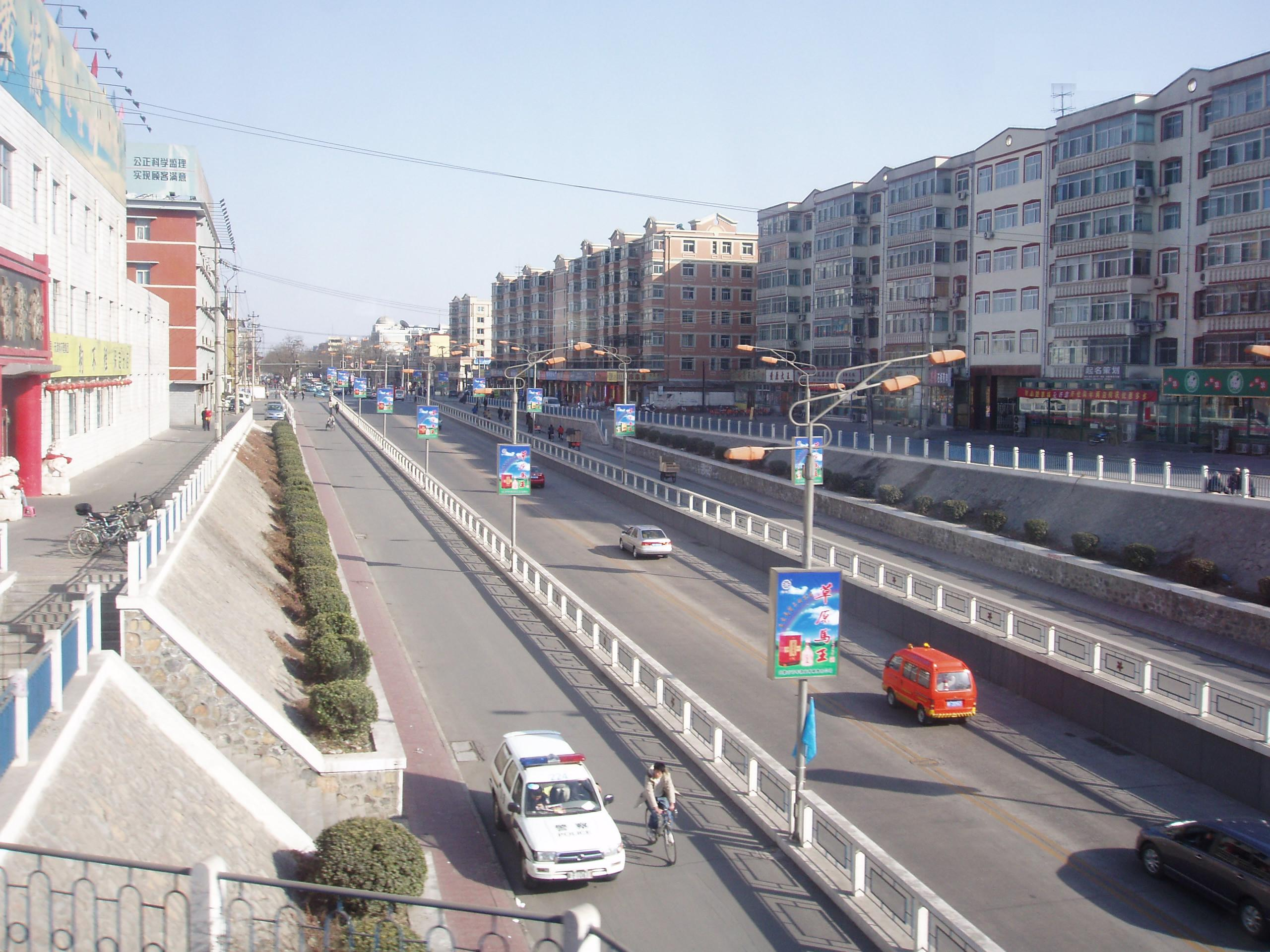
Qi Yi Zhong Road in Baoding

Perhaps the best-known item to supposedly originate in Baoding are Baoding balls, which can be used to relax one's keyboard hand and strengthen one's wrist.

The most famous local specialty food is the donkey burger. (Chinese: 驴肉火烧) Anxin County is home to the Quantou Village Music Association (圈头村音乐会), a well-known traditional music group performing on guan (oboes), sheng (mouth organs), and percussion. The village of Quantou is located on an island in Lake Baiyangdian. The city's streets follow a rough grid pattern, although this is less obvious in the older part of the city. The traditional main street of old Baoding is Yuhua Road, running from the city's centre to its eastern edge. Most of Baoding's historic buildings are located in this area, along with some of its larger shopping centres. Other major streets include Dongfeng Road and Chaoyang Avenue. There is a ring road around the city. Baoding is home to Hebei University, North China Electric Power University, three other universities and twelve colleges.

=== Historic sites ===
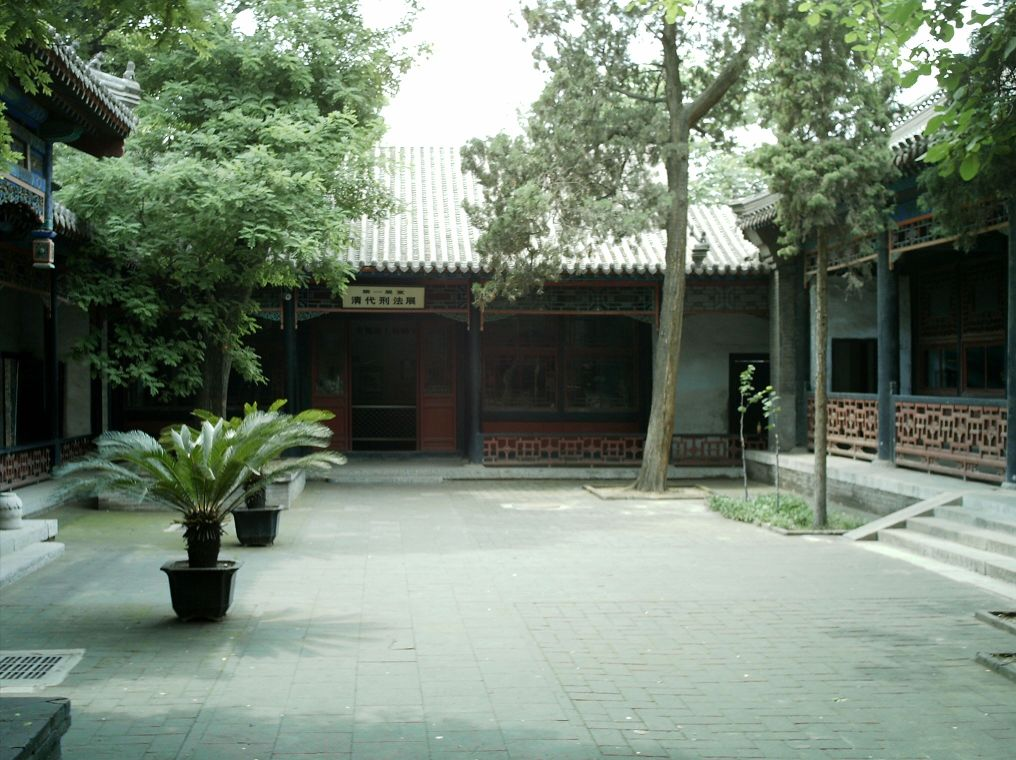
A courtyard in the mansion of the governor of Zhili

Baoding contains a number of notable historic sites. In the city proper, there can be found a historic provincial governor's mansion and an ancient lotus garden. In the hills to the northwest of the city, near the suburb of Mancheng, there are the Mancheng Han Tombs, where Prince Liu Sheng and his wife Dou Wan were buried.

The greater Baoding administrative area has 16 designated state-level cultural relics:

1. Yan State Capital Relics (475BC-221BC, Yixian County)
2. Great Wall at Zijinguan Pass (1368–1644, Yixian County and Laiyuan County)
3. Stele of Lao Tzu's Tao Te Ching (618-907, Yixian County)
4. Western Qing Tombs (1730–1915, Yixian County)
5. Geyuan Temple (916-1125, Laiyuan County)
6. Ciyun Pavilion (1306, Dingxing County)
7. Yicihui Stone Pillar (550-577, Dingxing County)
8. Kaiyuan Temple (960-1127, Dingzhou County)
9. Kaishan Temple (618-907, Gaobeidian County)
10. Dingzhou Porcelain Kiln Relic (960-1127, Quyang County)
11. Beiyue Temple (386-543, Quyang County)
12. Jin-cha-ji Border Region Headquarters Ruins (1938, Fuping County)
13. Ranzhuang Underground Tunnel (1937–1945, Qingyuan County)
14. Mancheng Han Tombs (154BC-113BC, Mancheng County)
15. Zhili Provincial Governor Office (1730–1911, Baoding)
16. Historical Site of the Baoding Military Academy (1902–1923)

== Notable people ==
- Abbie Goodrich Chapin (1868–1956), American missionary teacher based in Baoding
- Chen Xu, Director of the Overseas Chinese Affairs Office
- Fan Hongbin—gymnast, Olympic silver medalist in 1996 Summer Olympics
- Fan Ye—gymnast, 2003 World Artistic Gymnastics Championships balance beam gold medalist
- Guo Jingjing—diver and Olympic gold medalist in 2004 and 2008 Summer Olympics
- Qian Hong—swimmer and Olympic gold medalist in 1992 Summer Olympics
- Shi Changxu—materials scientist, recipient of the 2010 State Preeminent Science and Technology Award
- Tie Ning—author, president of the China Writers Association
- Wei Jianjun—billionaire, chairman of Great Wall Motors
- Yan Su—Chinese playwright and lyricist
- Xie Jun—chess grandmaster and Women's World Chess Champion 1991–1996, 1999–2001
- Zhang Shangwu–gymnast, 2001 Summer Universiade still rings gold medalist

== Sister cities ==
Baoding is twinned with:

- United States, Charlotte, North Carolina, 1987-09-29
- Japan, Yonago, Tottori, 1991-10-13
- Japan, Saijō, Ehime, 1994-9-21
- Iceland, Hafnarfjörður, 1994-10-09
- Japan, Kushima, Miyazaki, 2000-11-20
- South Korea, Dongdaemun District, Seoul, 2001-02-19
- Canada, Gravenhurst, Ontario, 2002-12-5
- Panama, Santiago de Veraguas, 2006-12-15
- Denmark, Sønderborg Municipality, 2012-04-23

== Gallery ==
Images from Baoding

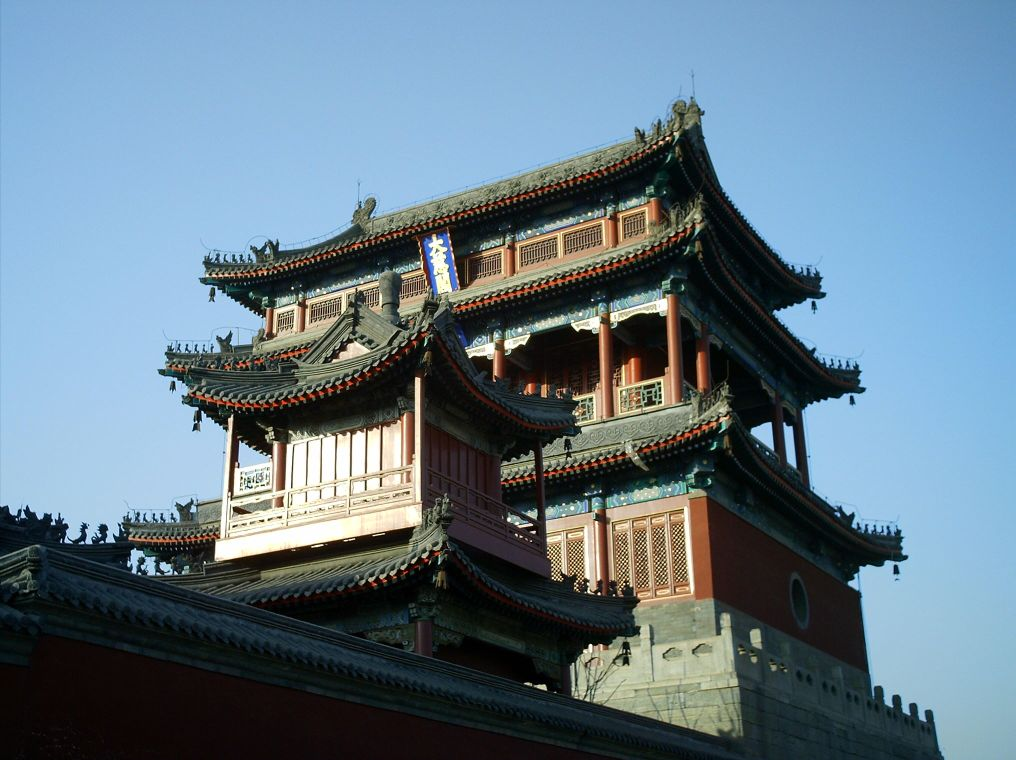
Temple in the centre of old Baoding

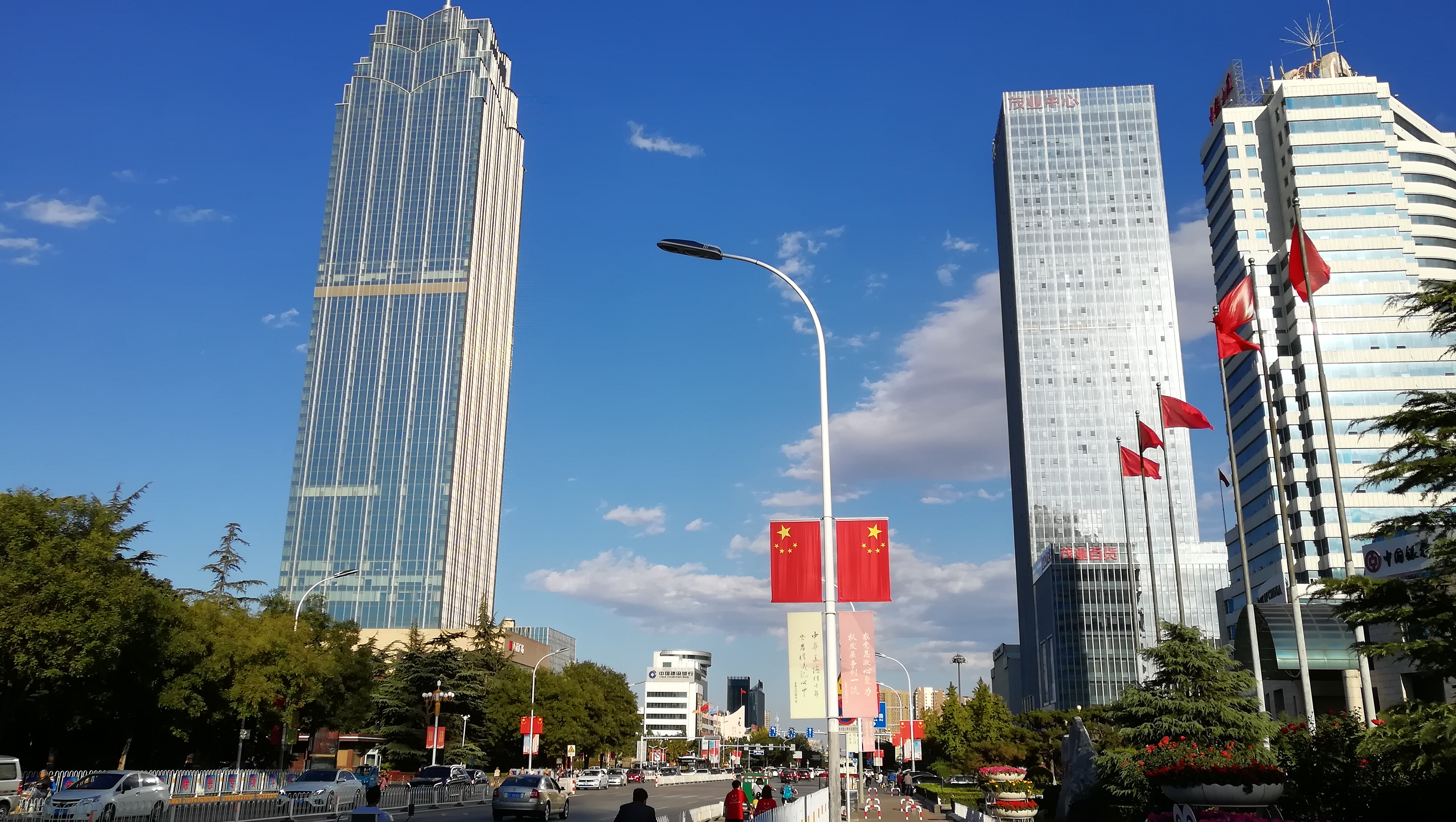
Dongfeng Road, Baoding

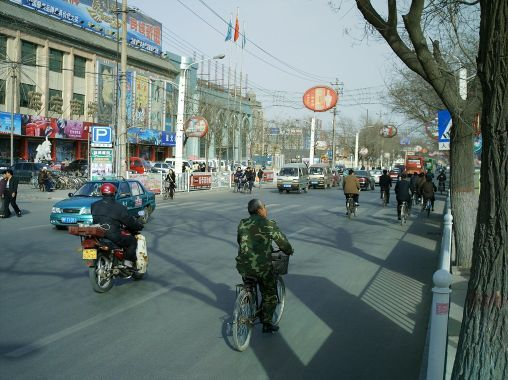
Part of Yuhua Road, the main street of old Baoding

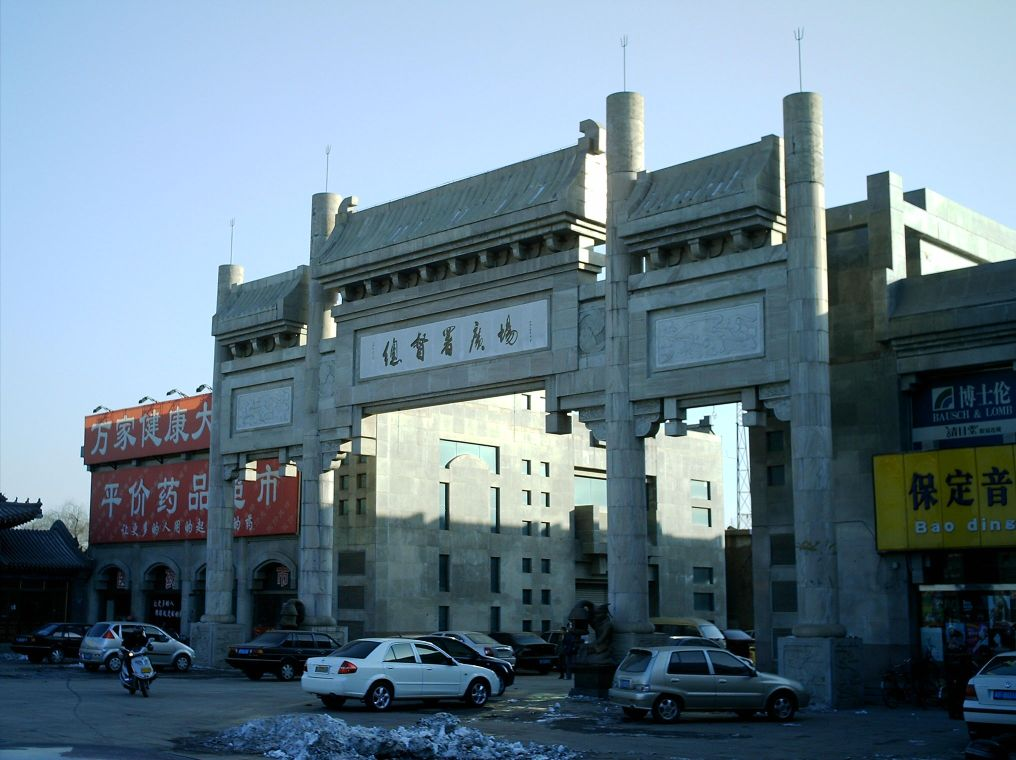
Arch on Yuhua Road, old Baoding

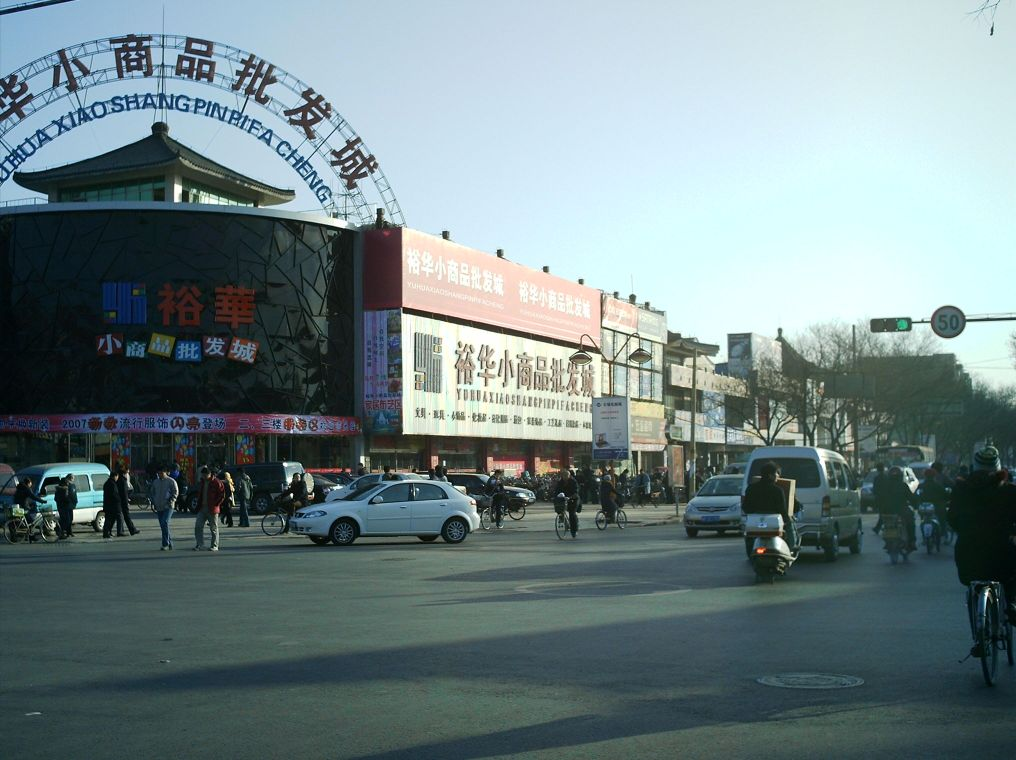
An intersection in Yuhua Road's shopping district

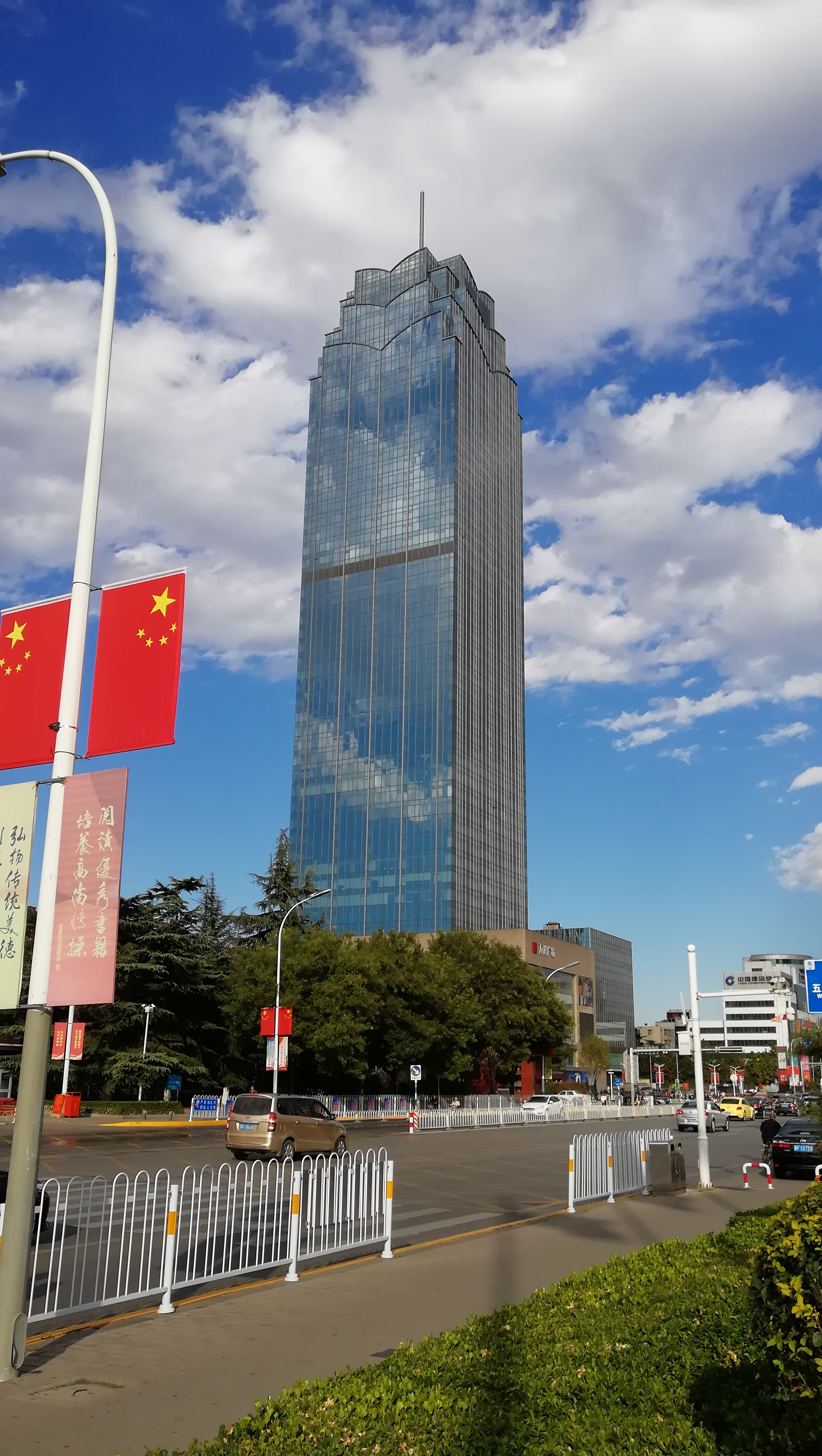
The Wanbo Tower in a sunny afternoon, Baoding CBD

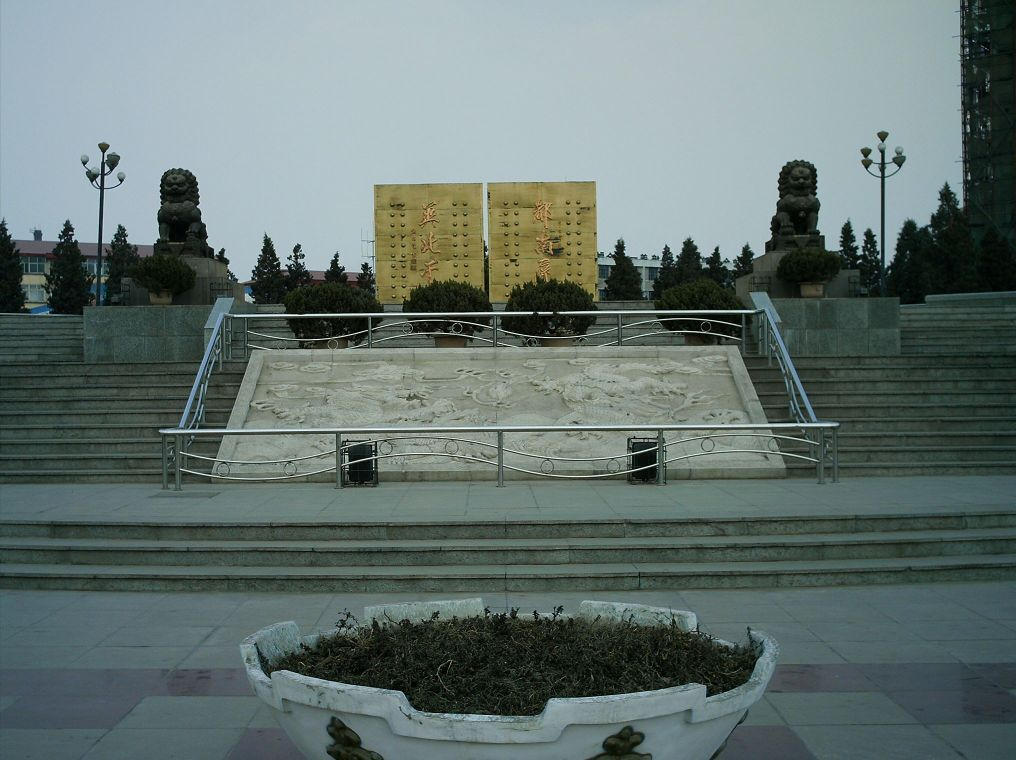
A civic monument

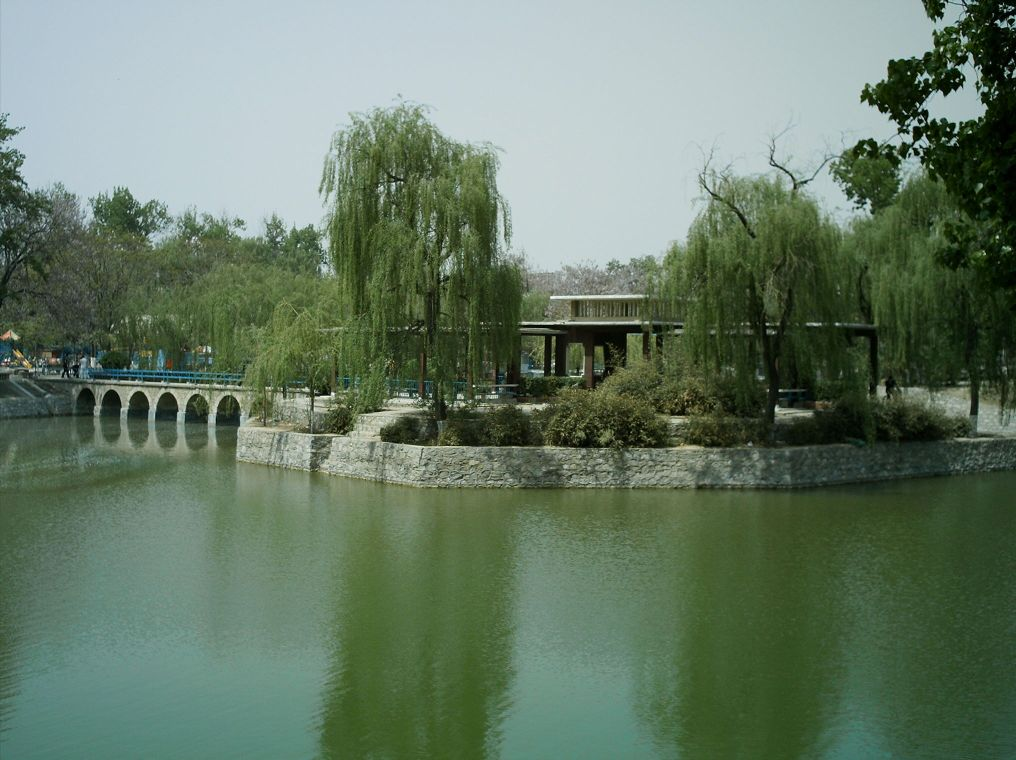
A public park

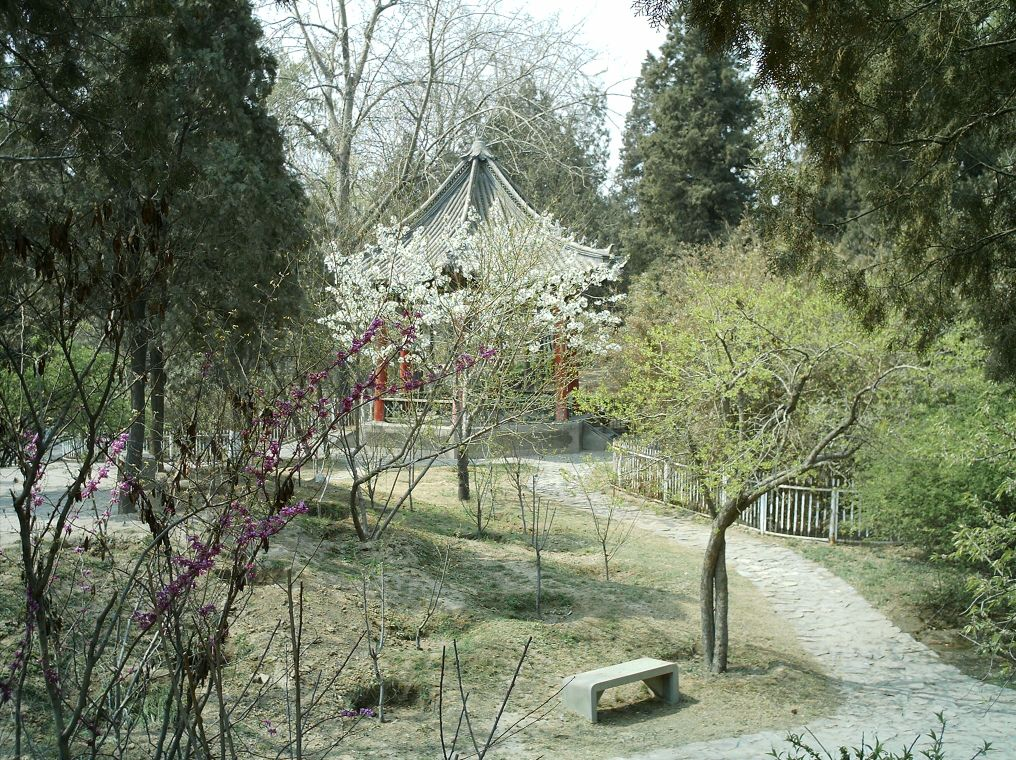
A public park

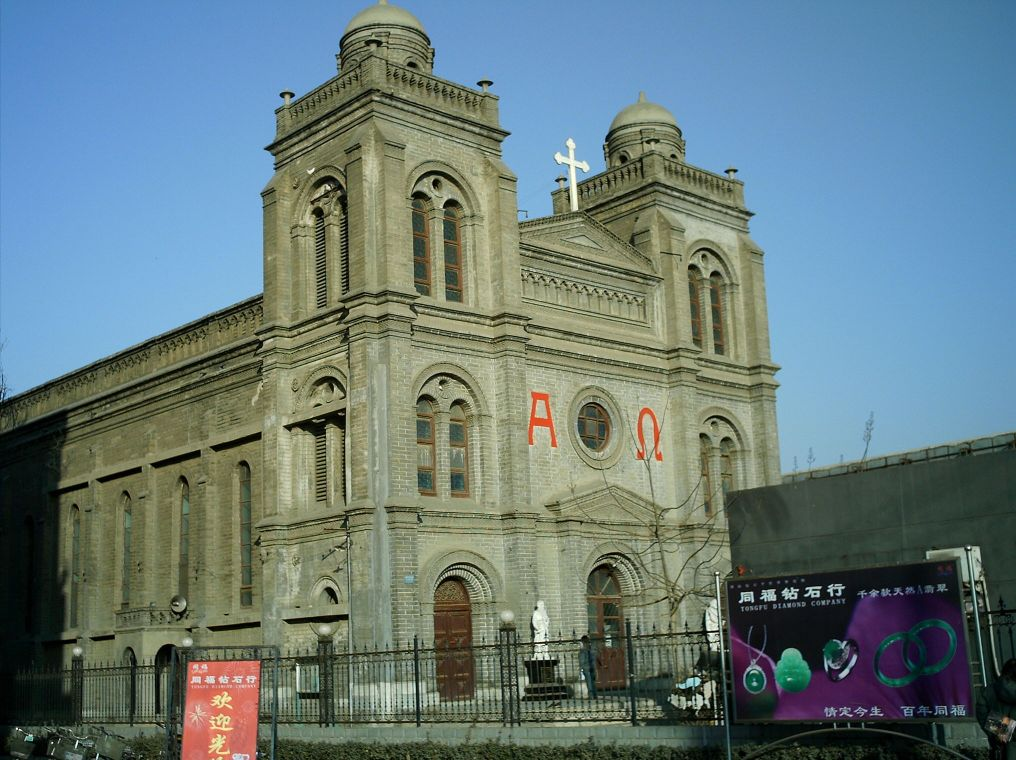
Baoding Cathedral

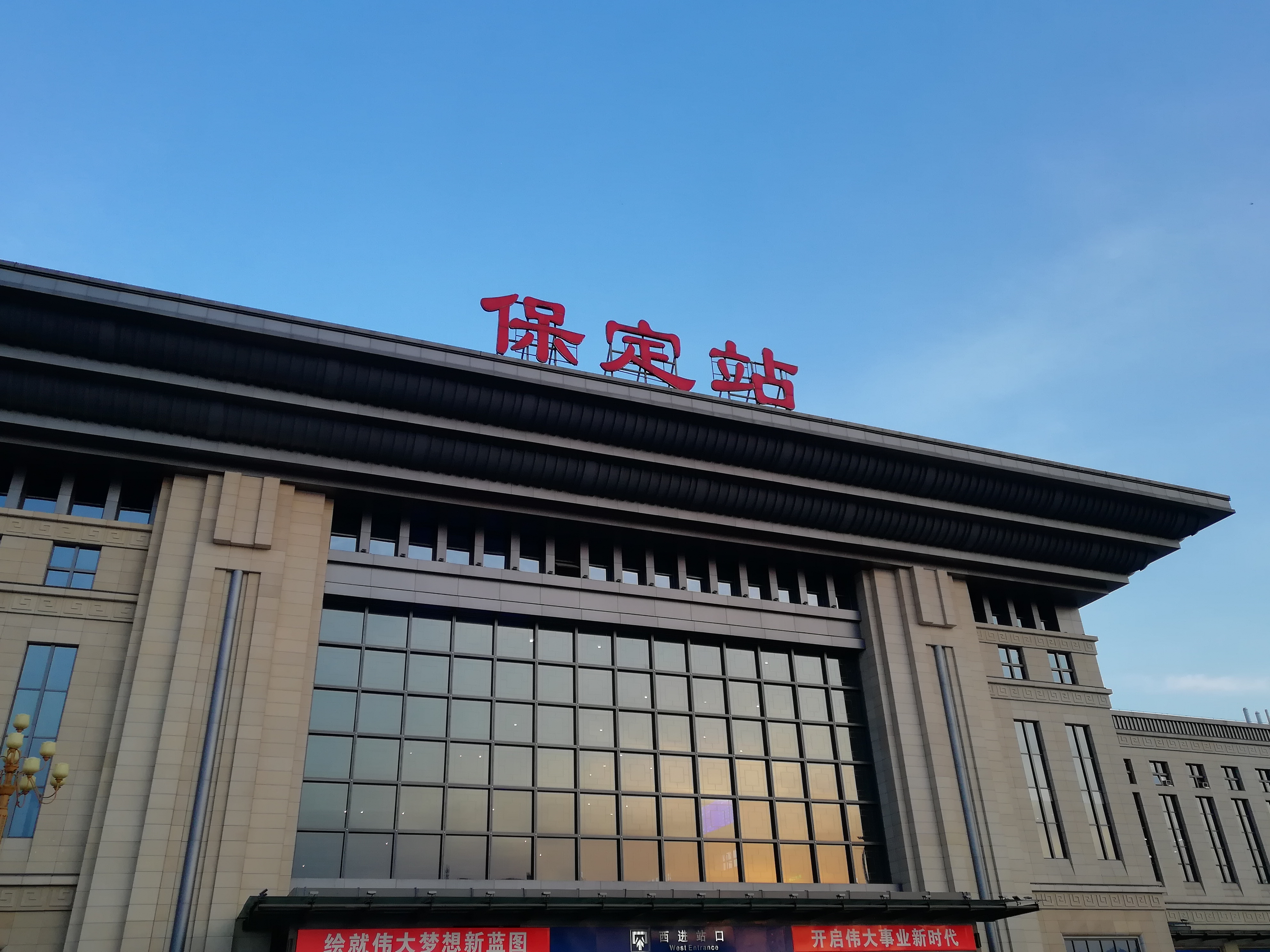
Baoding Railway Station

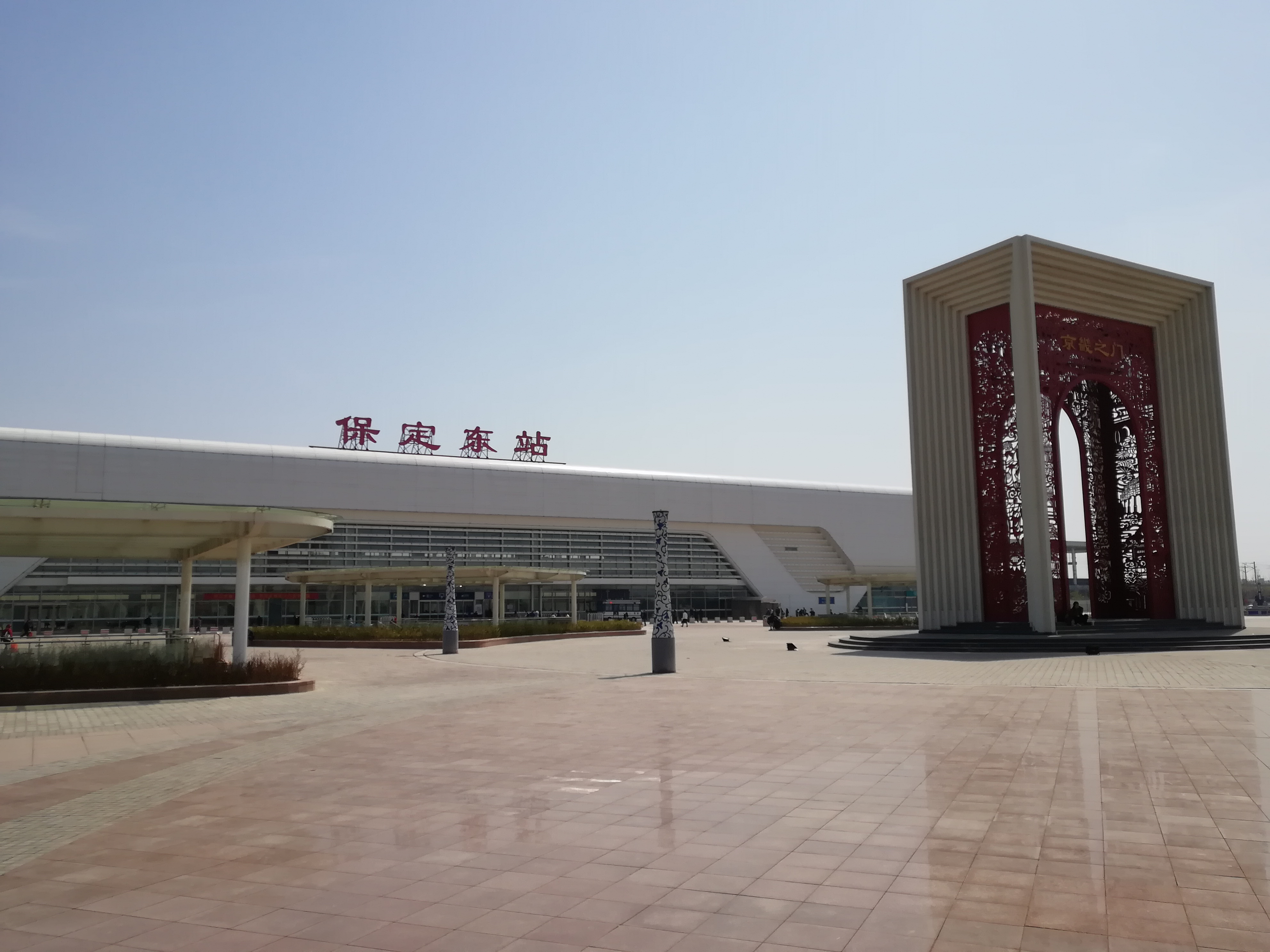
Baoding East Railway Station for High-Speed Rail Trains

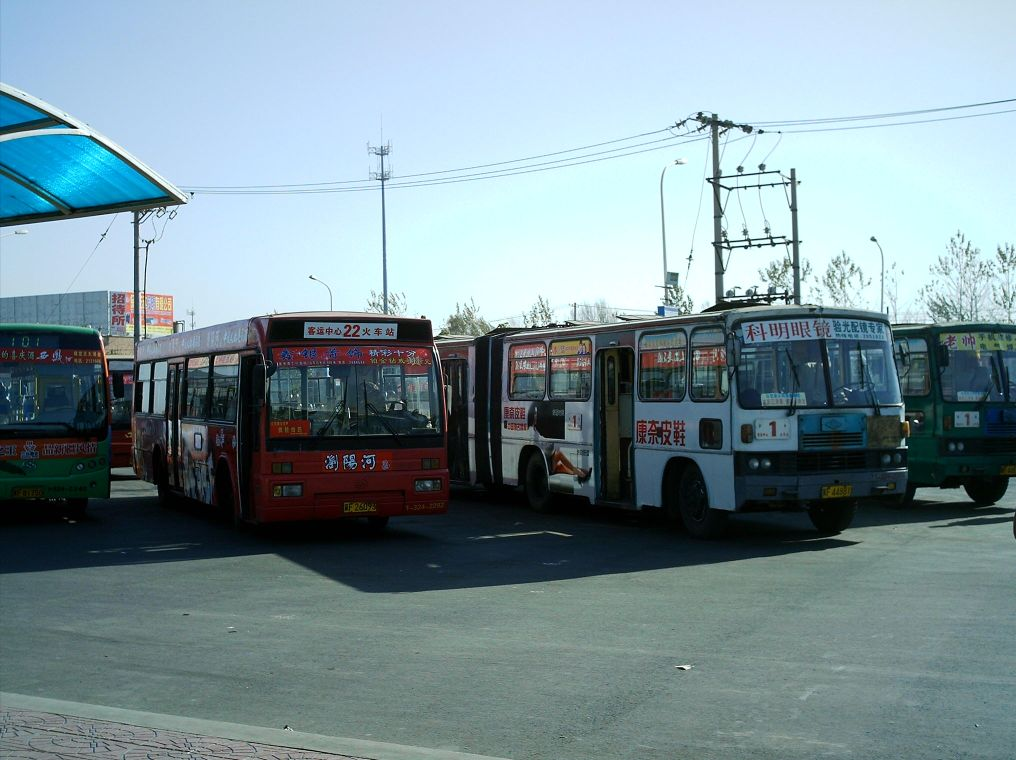
Baoding city buses before 2007

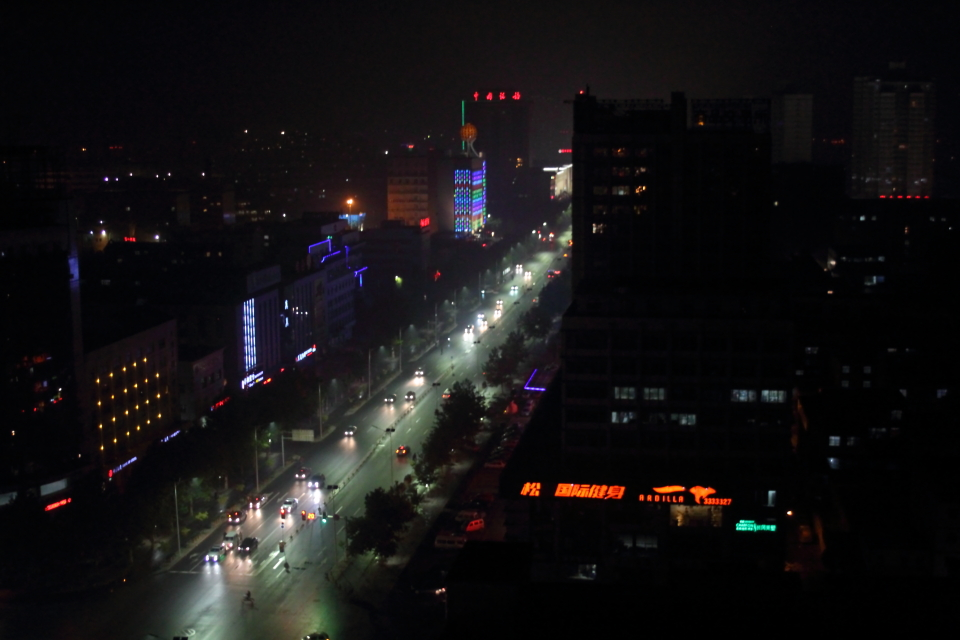
Baoding in the evening

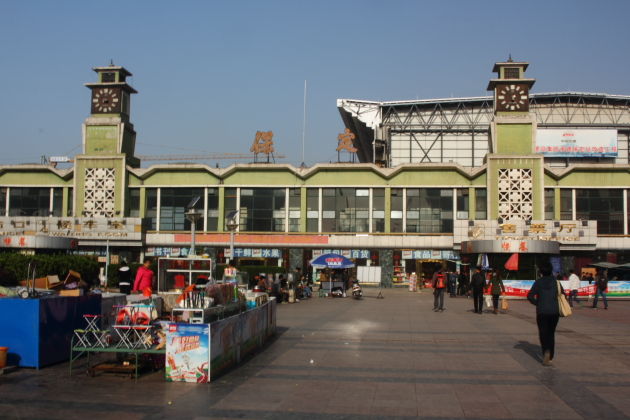
Old Baoding railway station

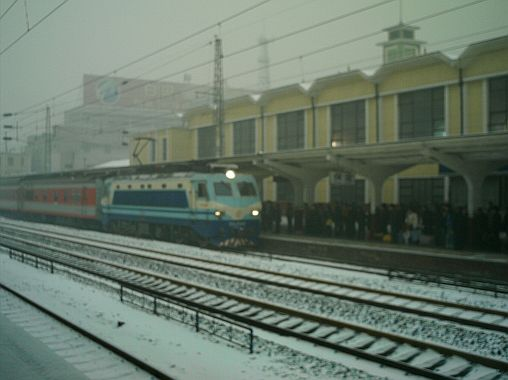
Old Baoding railway station

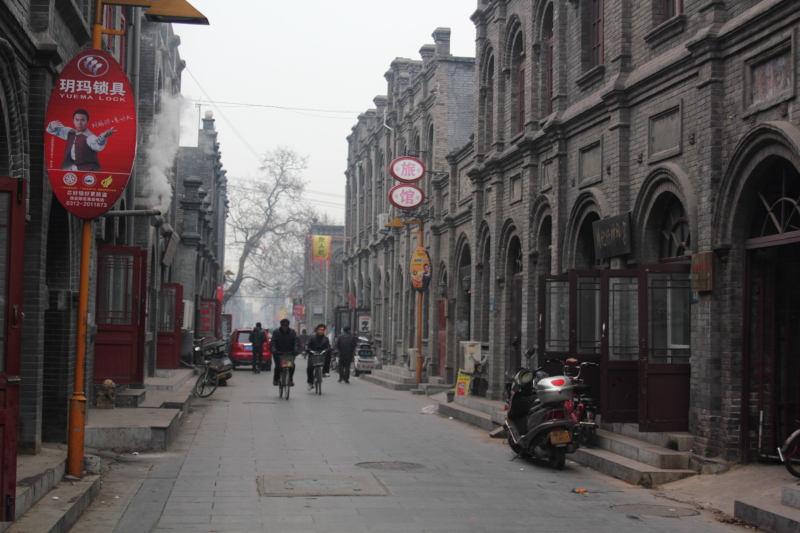
Baoding Old Quarter

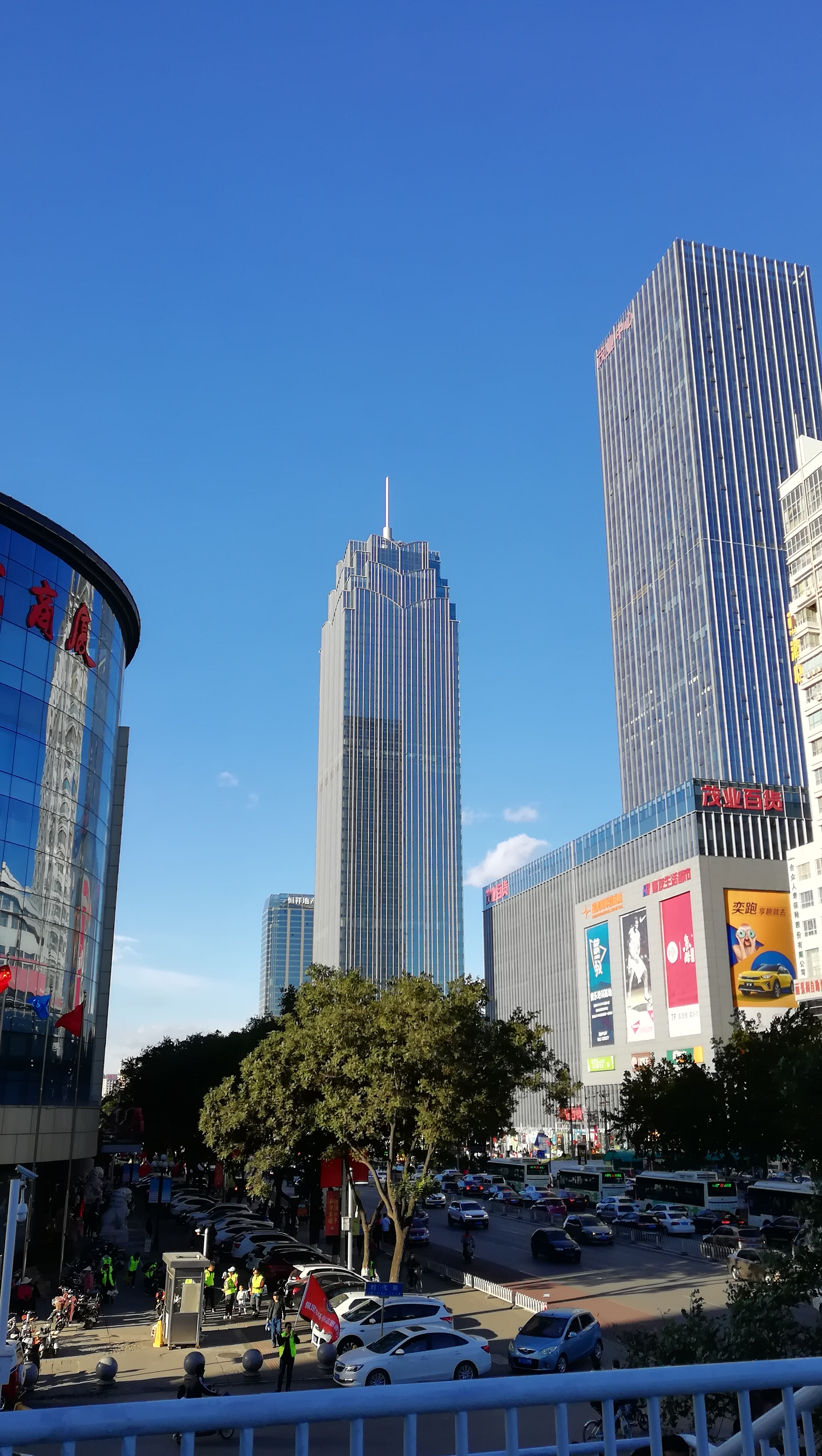
Skylines in Baoding CBD

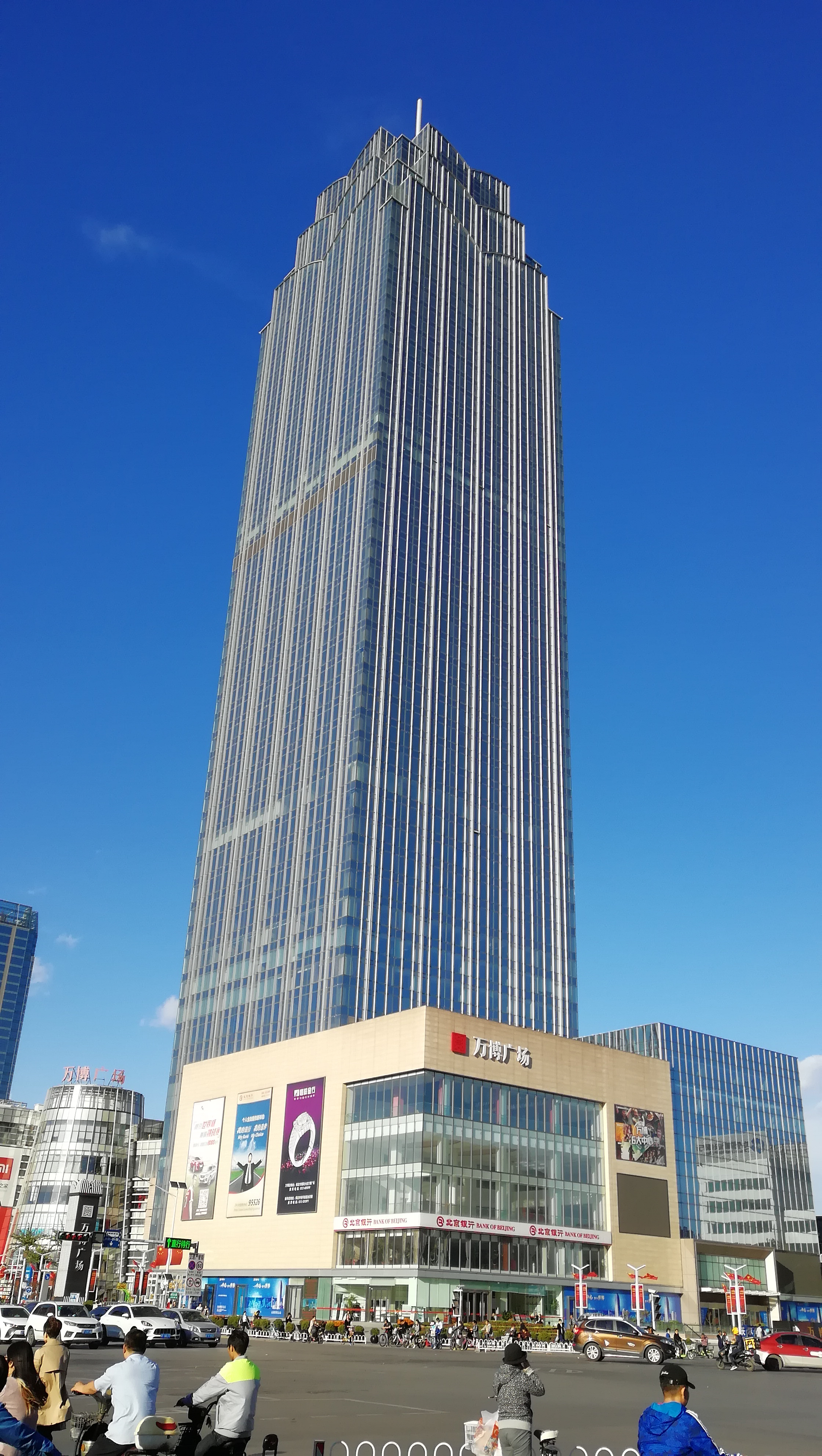
Closer look at the Wanbo Tower in a sunny day

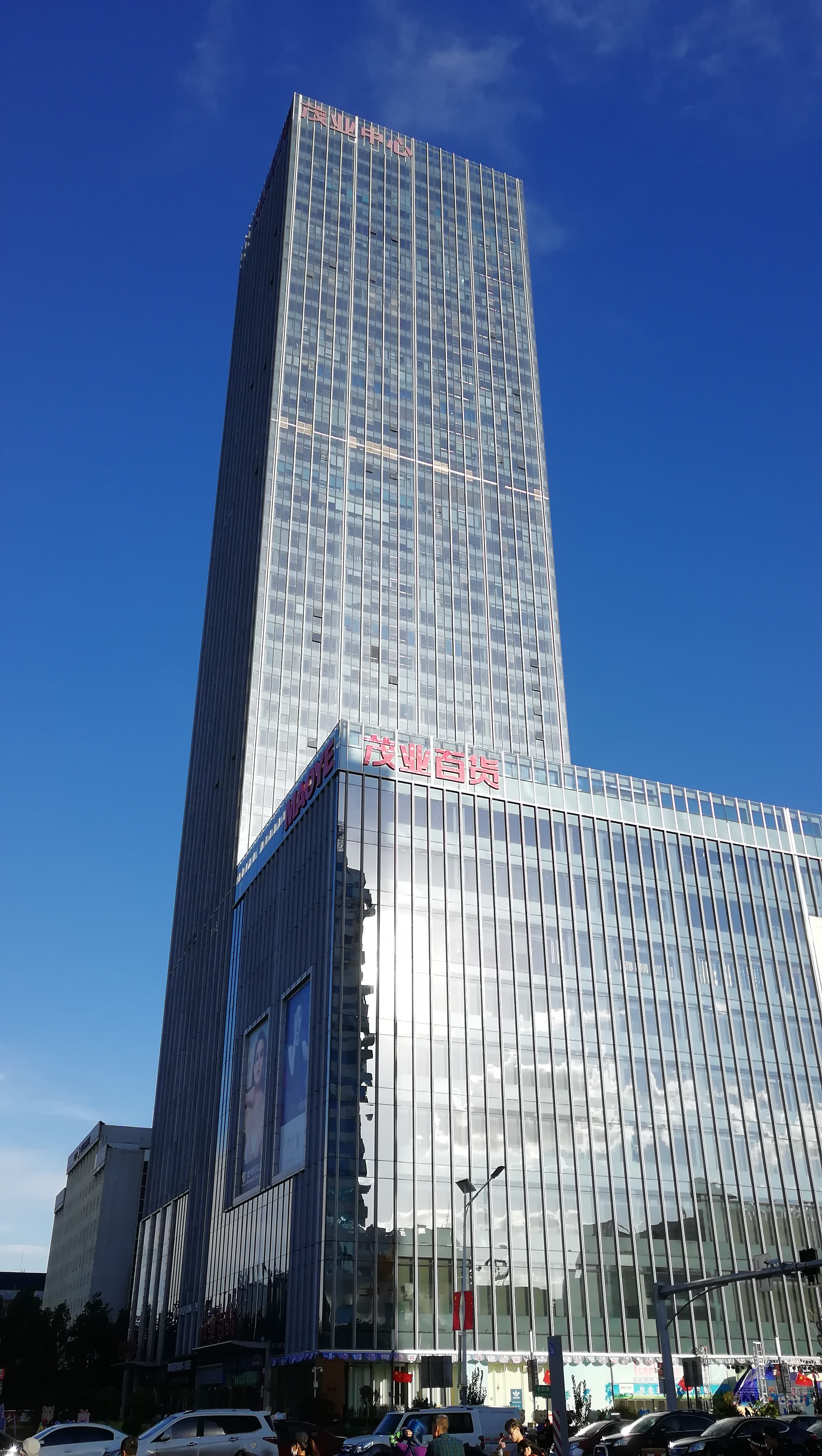
Closer look at the Maoye Tower in a sunny day, Baoding CBD

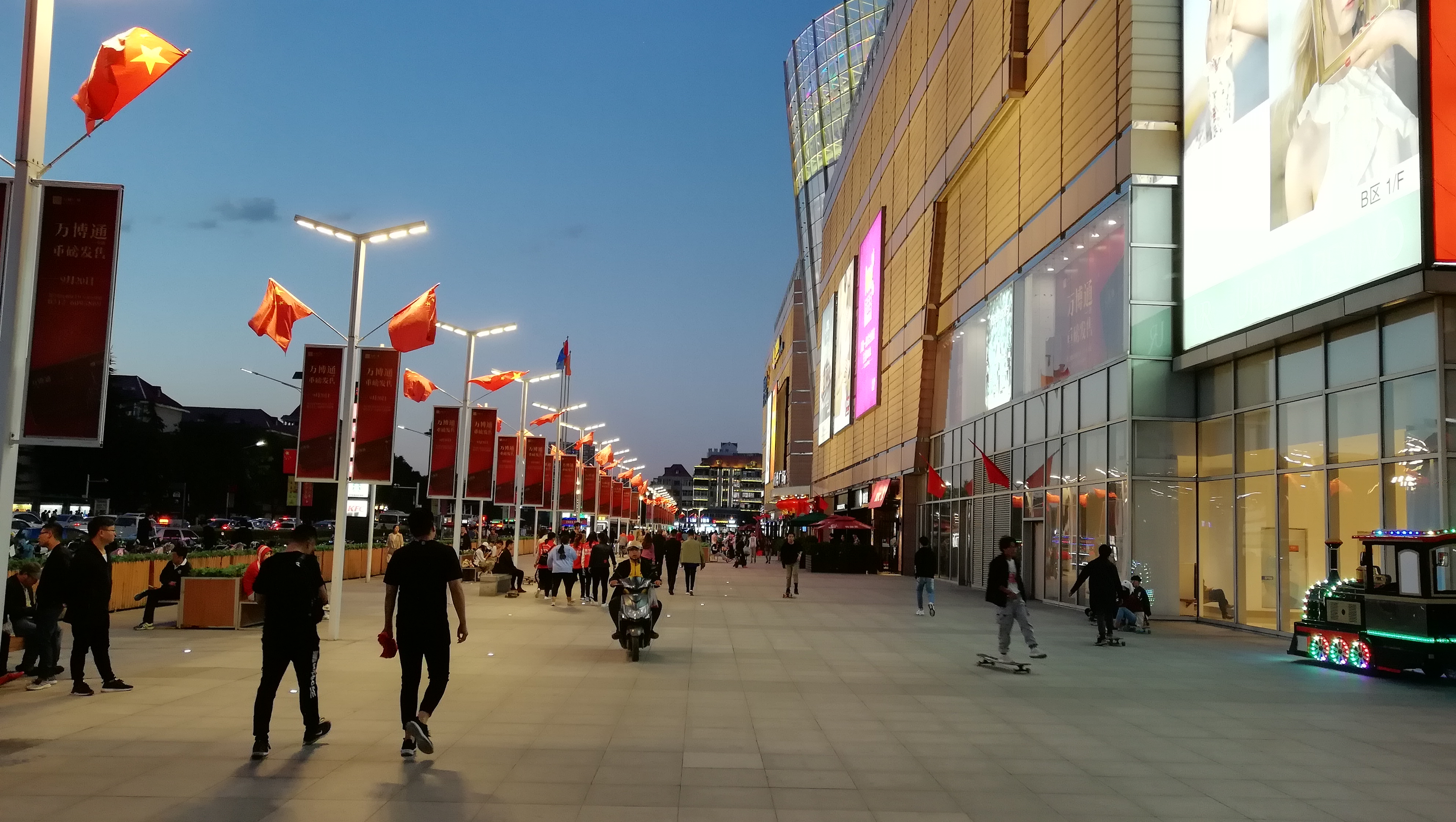
The Wanbo Plaza at night, Baoding CBD

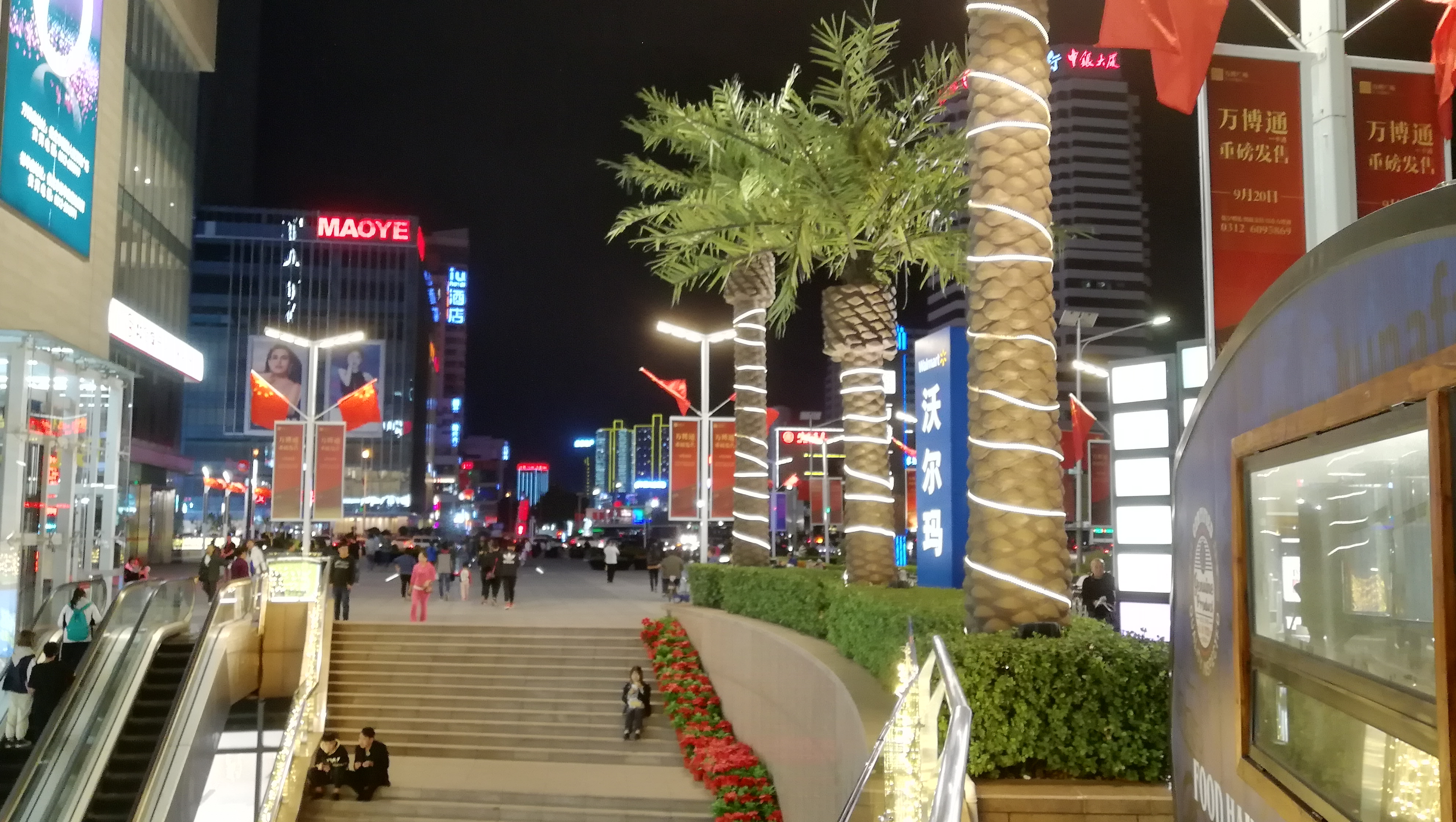
The Wanbo Plaza at night, Baoding CBD

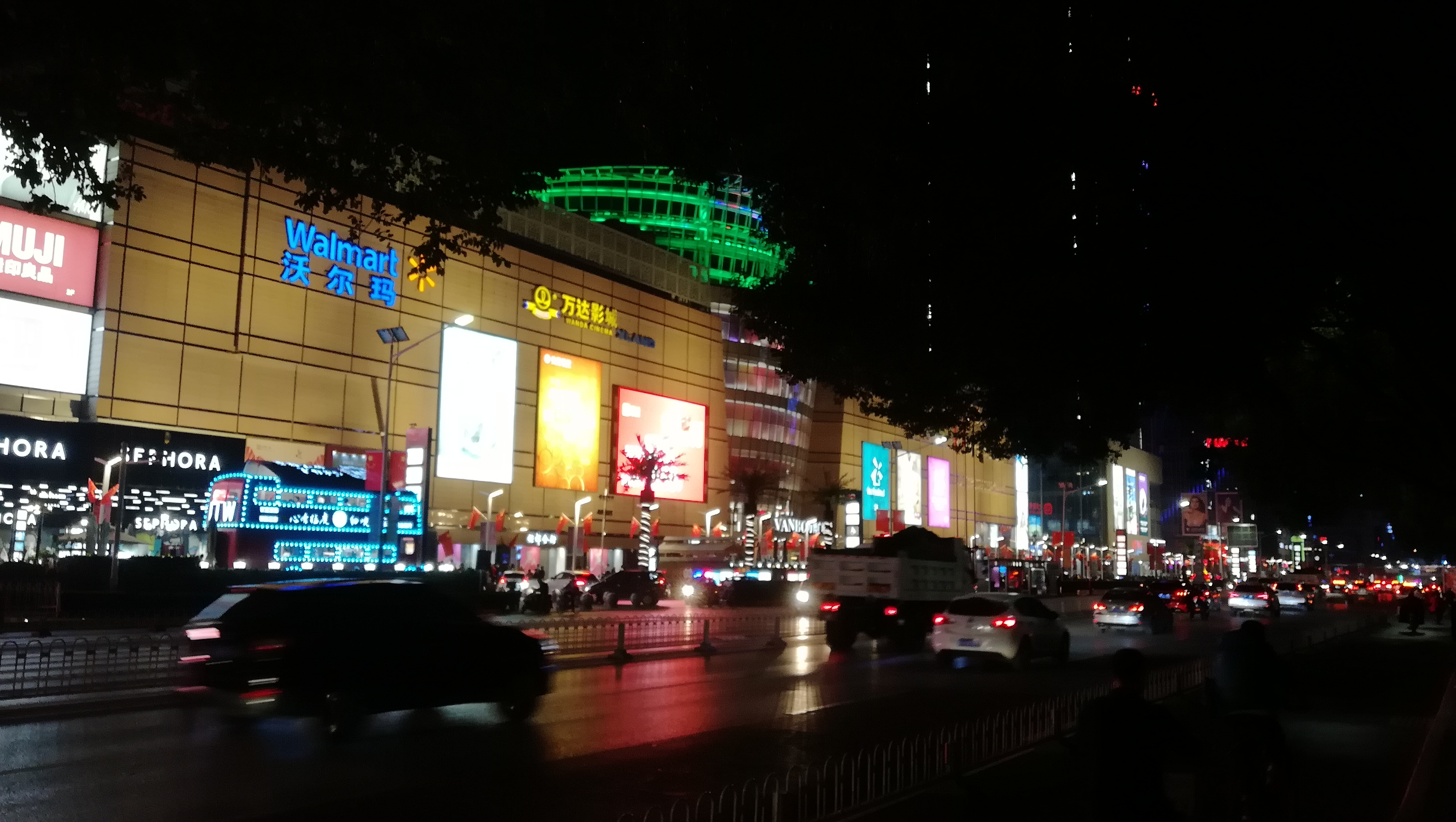
The Wanbo Plaza at night, Baoding CBD

== See also ==
- List of twin towns and sister cities in China
