= Shawo =

Shawo may refer to the following locations in China:

Town

- Shawo, Xin County (沙窝镇), in Xin County, Xinyang, Henan

Townships

- Shawo Township, Hebei (砂窝乡), in Fuping County
- Shawo Township, Henan (沙沃乡), in Qi County, Kaifeng
- Shawo Township, Hubei (沙窝乡), in Echeng District, Ezhou, Hubei
- Shawo Township, Shandong (沙窝乡), in Dongming County

Villages

- Shawo, a village in Shawo Township, Echeng District, Ezhou, Hubei

Therpa Shawo : Tibetan nationality
