= Xidayang Reservoir =

Xidayang Reservoir 西大洋水库
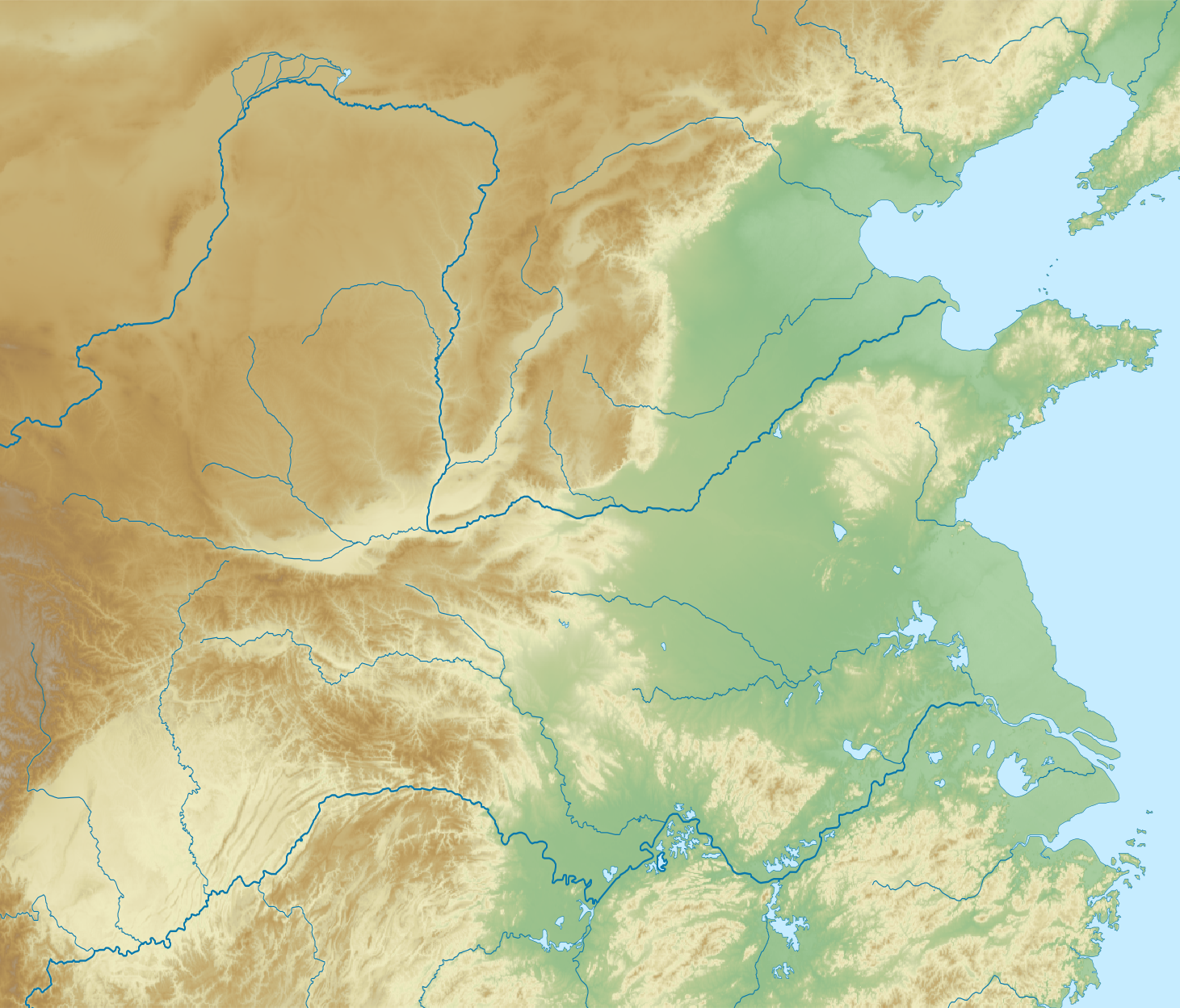
- Location within Hebei Location within Northern China Location within China
- Interactive map of Xidayang Reservoir 西大洋水库
- Location: at the confluence of Tang River and Tongtian River
- Coordinates: 38°45′22″N 114°46′05″E
- Type: large-scale reservoir
- Basin countries: China
- Built: 1958

Xidayang Reservoir (Chinese: 西大洋水库), also known as Xidayang Shuiku or West Dayang Reservoir, is a large-scale reservoir located in Baoshui Township, Tang County, Baoding City, Hebei Province, China.

== History ==
West Dayang Reservoir was designed by the Design Institute of Hebei Provincial Water Resources Department (河北省水利厅设计院), its construction began in 1958 and was completed in 1960. In August 1970, the continued construction of the reservoir was completed.

In 2005, Xidayang Reservoir's consolidating and de-danger engineering (除险加固工程) started, with a total investment of 198 million yuan and a construction period of 36 months.

In 2008, the connection project between Xidayang Reservoir and Wangkuai Reservoir was started, and in 2012, the connection project was completed.
