= Five Mountains =

This is a disambiguation page.

- For the Five Great Zen Temples in Kamakura and Kyoto, see Five Mountain System. The same relates to the Japanese Zen temple ranking system.
- For the Five Mountains literature, see Japanese Literature of the Five Mountains.
- For the Five Mountain Peaks in Chinese culture, see Sacred Mountains of China.
- For the Five Mountain Peaks in Korean culture, see Five Mountains of Korea.
