= Deng Xiaolan =

Deng Xiaolan (邓小岚, 1943-March 21, 2022), born in Fuping, Hebei Province, was a female political and educational figure in the People's Republic of China and the daughter of Deng Tuo, former president of the People's Daily. She was selected as one of the 2022 Touching China Annual Person of the Year Award.

== Biography ==
=== Early life ===
Deng Xiaolan was born in 1943 in the anti-Japanese base area under the jurisdiction of the Chinese Communist Party (CCP). Her father, Deng Tuo, was the president of the Jin-Cha-Ji Daily. As the Japanese army often carried out raids in the Jin-Cha-Ji border area, the newspaper office, which was originally located in Malan Village, had to be relocated several times. Deng Xiaolan's mother, Ding Yilan, gave birth to her in Yijiazhuang Village during a breakout. Her parents were unable to take care of Deng Xiaolan due to work, so they placed her in the care of villagers in Malan Village. Deng Xiaolan spent her childhood in Malan Village.

After the CCP Central Committee moved to Beijing in 1949, Deng Xiaolan moved to Beijing with her parents. Deng Xiaolan received a good education since childhood. Because of her excellent music teacher, music became Deng Xiaolan's lifelong hobby. Deng Xiaolan attended the Girls' High School Affiliated to Beijing Normal University for high school. While in high school, Deng Xiaolan submitted an application to join the party. Later, she was admitted to the Department of Chemical Engineering of Tsinghua University. On April 28, 1965, Deng Xiaolan was approved to join the CCP. In 1966, Deng Tuo committed suicide due to persecution, and his family was also seriously affected.

=== Work ===
After graduating from Tsinghua University in 1970, Deng Xiaolan was forced to leave Beijing and was assigned to Tai'an, Shandong. She was introduced by an acquaintance to work at Tai'an Telecommunications Factory No. 3, where she met her husband Liu Qinggang and married him. She was later transferred to work at a pharmaceutical factory, where she implemented a strict quality inspection system for drugs. In 1986, Deng Xiaolan went to Fuzhou to attend a seminar on the 20th anniversary of Deng Tuo's death. In 1994, she accompanied her mother to Fuzhou to attend the opening ceremony of the Deng Tuo Memorial Hall.

In 1995, Deng Xiaolan returned to Beijing and worked in the Beijing Public Security Science and Technology Management Department. She retired in 2003. Because her mother Ding Yilan was devoted to the study of the history of the Jin-Cha-Ji Daily, Deng Xiaolan also joined the Jin-Cha-Ji Daily History Research Association and later served as the association's vice president.

=== Voluntary teaching in Malan Village ===
Deng Xiaolan has always had a deep affection for Malan Village, where she grew up. During her working years, Deng Xiaolan visited Malan Village twice, in 1997 and 2002. After retirement, Deng Xiaolan and her former newspaper staff went to Malan Village to sweep the graves of the Chinese Communist Party's anti-Japanese martyrs. They met a group of children who came to sweep the graves. Deng Xiaolan found that they could not sing, and only one or two of them could barely sing the national anthem. Deng Xiaolan decided to teach them to sing.

Since 2004, Deng Xiaolan has traveled from Beijing to Malan Village almost every month to teach. With the help of her husband, brothers, and sisters, she raised 40,000 yuan to renovate the school building for the local primary school and brought various musical instruments. In 2006, Deng Xiaolan established the Malan Band. After 2008, she held various small concerts and music festivals in the name of the band. She also performed on Hebei TV and Beijing TV.

In September 2021, the director team of the Beijing Winter Olympics opening ceremony noticed that there were many children in Fuping who were influenced by music, so they invited 44 primary school students from Chengnanzhuang to form the Malanhua Choir to participate in the Beijing Winter Olympics opening ceremony chorus, of which 8 students were from the Malan Band. At the opening ceremony of the Winter Olympics in February 2022, the choir sang the Olympic Hymn in Greek.

=== Death ===
On March 19, 2022, Deng Xiaolan suffered a cerebral thrombosis and fell while being interviewed in Malan Village. After thrombolysis at Fuping County Hospital, she was rushed to Beijing Tiantan Hospital, but she eventually died at 23:48 on the 21st at the age of 79.

== Legacy ==
Due to the COVID-19 pandemic, the CCP Fuping County Committee and Deng Xiaolan's family decided not to hold a funeral ceremony. Deng Xiaolan's ashes were buried in Malan Village. The CCP Baoding Municipal Committee Publicity Department and others awarded Deng Xiaolan the title of "Baoding City's Most Beautiful Teacher" and recommended her to the Hebei Provincial Department of Education as the country's most beautiful teacher.

On April 8, 2022, the CCP Central Committee and the State Council of the People's Republic of China posthumously awarded Deng Xiaolan the title of "Individual with Outstanding Contribution to the Beijing Winter Olympics and Paralympics", making her the only person to be posthumously awarded this award. On March 4, 2023, Deng Xiaolan was selected as one of the 2022 China's Most Touching Persons of the Year.
