= Mount Heng (Shanxi) =

Mountain in the country of China

Heng Shan
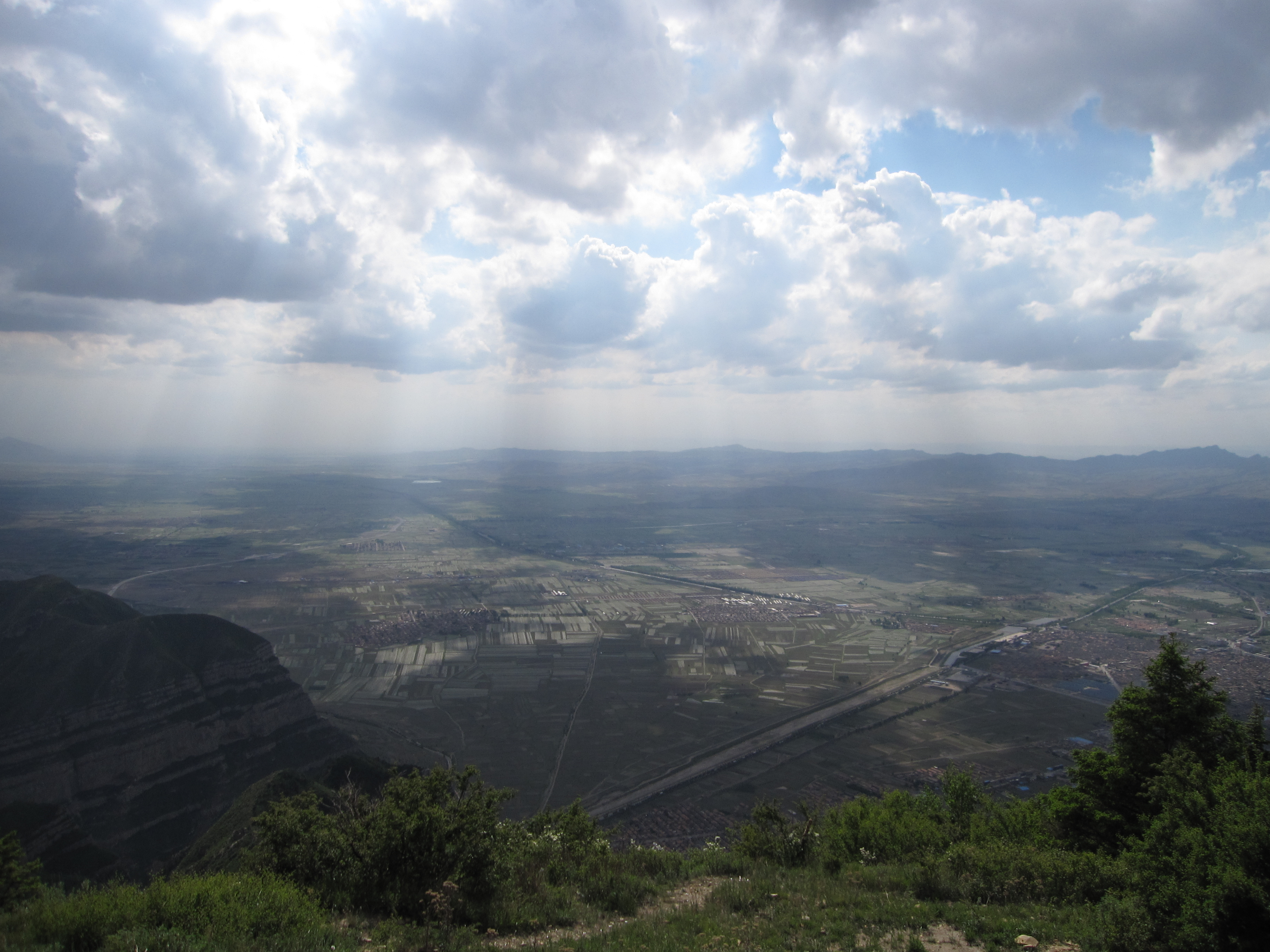
- View from the summit of Heng Shan

Highest point
- Elevation: 2,017 m (6,617 ft)
- Coordinates: 39°40′26″N 113°44′08″E

Geography
- Location: Shanxi, China

Mount Heng
- "Mount Heng" in Simplified (top) and Traditional (bottom) Chinese characters
- Simplified Chinese: 恒山
- Traditional Chinese: 恆山
Transcriptions
Standard Mandarin
- Hanyu Pinyin: Héngshān
- Wade–Giles: Hêng-shan
- IPA: [xə̌ŋ ʂán]
Wu
- Romanization: Oen^{去} se^{平}
Yue: Cantonese
- Yale Romanization: Hàhng sāan
- Jyutping: Hang4 saan1
Southern Min
- Hokkien POJ: Hêng-soaⁿ
- Tâi-lô: Hîng san

Former names

Mount Chang
- Chinese: 常山
Transcriptions
Standard Mandarin
- Hanyu Pinyin: Chángshān
- Wade–Giles: Ch‘ang-shan

Mount Heng, also known by its Chinese name Hengshan, is a mountain in north-central China's Shanxi Province, known as the northern mountain of the Five Great Mountains of China. Heng Shan in Shanxi Province is sometimes known as the Northern Heng Shan, and the one in Hunan Province as Southern Heng Shan. Both mountains have the same pronunciation in Chinese, and the Southern Heng Shan is also one of the Five Sacred Mountains.

== History ==
Like the other mountains in China with strong Taoist presence, Heng Shan has been considered a sacred mountain since the Zhou dynasty. Due to its northerly location, often under control of non-Chinese nations, the mountain has a weaker history of pilgrimage than its four fellows. Indeed, to this day it is the least-visited and least-developed of the five, also the smallest in area. Because of this, Hengshan is not nearly as religiously important in China as the other Taoist mountains. But as a further consequence, it is also less commercialized—there are no hotels on the mountain, for instance. The main peak is a lovely hike of around three hours round trip from the parking lot (a few miles up the mountain from where you buy the ticket), with the summit covered in fragrant lilac blossoms in June, and temples set into the cliffs. The slopes are largely covered with hemlocks, pines, elm, fir, poplar, and hawthorn, in the barer areas.

== Temples ==
During the Han dynasty, a temple called the Shrine of the Northern Peak (Beiyue Miao), dedicated to the mountain god was built on Hengshan's slopes. While periodically destroyed and rebuilt, this temple has an uninterrupted history from Han times to the present day. During times of occupation by non-Han Chinese people, worship to Hengshan was done at the Beiyue Temple in Quyang.

Another temple of the area is the famous Hanging Temple, built more than 1,500 years ago into a cliff near the Mount.

== See also ==
- Four Mountains
