= Wangkuai Reservoir =

Wangkuai Reservoir 王快水库
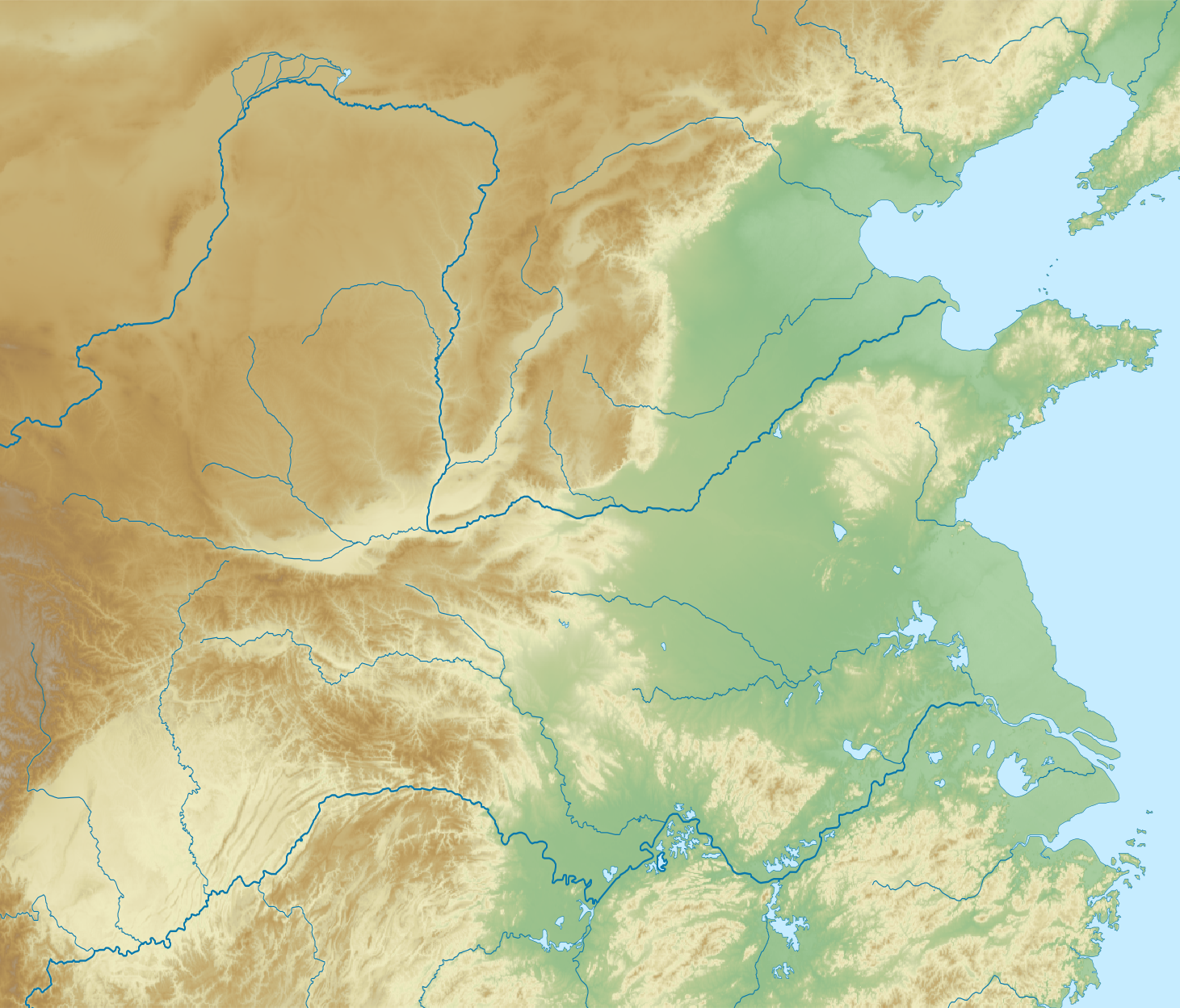
- Location within Hebei Location within Northern China Location within China
- Location: Dangcheng, Baoding
- Coordinates: 38°45′30″N 114°26′20″E
- Type: large-scale reservoir
- Basin countries: China
- Built: 1958

Wangkuai Reservoir (Chinese: 王快水库), also known as Wangkuai Shuiku, is a large-scale reservoir located in Dangcheng Township, Quyang County, Baoding City, Hebei Province, China. It controls a watershed area of 3,770 square kilometers with a total reservoir capacity of 1,389 million cubic meters. This project was designed by the Hebei Provincial Water Resources Department (河北省水利厅).

== History ==
Construction of Wangkuai Reservoir was started in June 1958 and was basically completed in July 1960. The continuation project of the reservoir was carried out in 1969, and was completed in 1974. Its de-risking and strengthening project started in 2002 with a three-year construction period.

In 2008, the connection project between Xidayang Reservoir and Wangkuai Reservoir was started, and in 2012, the connection project was completed.
