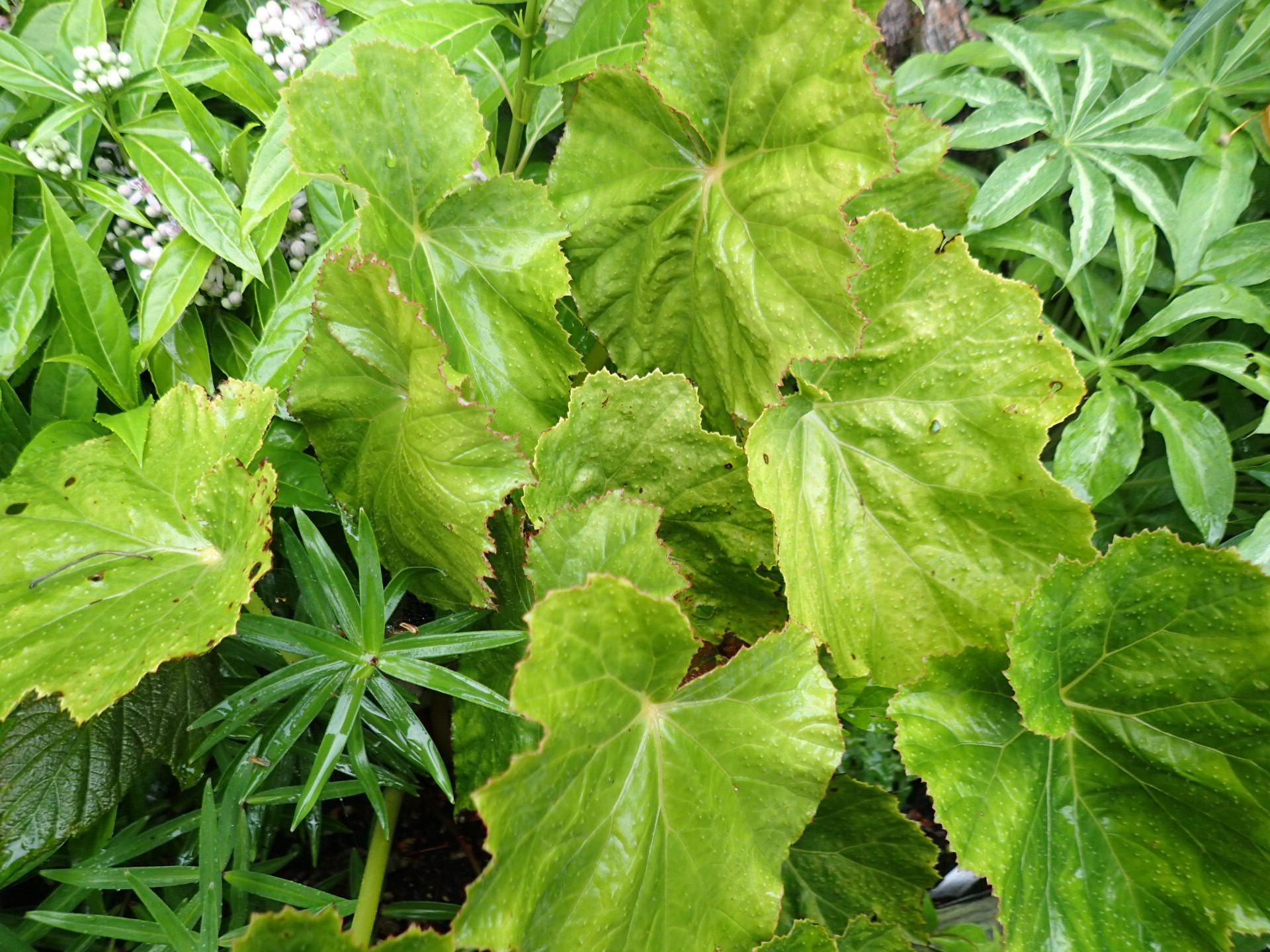
- Foliage

Scientific classification
- Kingdom: Plantae
- Clade: Tracheophytes
- Clade: Angiosperms
- Clade: Eudicots
- Clade: Rosids
- Order: Cucurbitales
- Family: Begoniaceae
- Genus: Begonia
- Species: B. emeiensis

Binomial name
- Begonia emeiensis C.M.Hu

= Begonia emeiensis =

Species of plant

Begonia emeiensis, the Mount Emei begonia, is a species of flowering plant in the family Begoniaceae. It is native to Sichuan, apparently only to the slopes of Mount Emei, one of the Four Sacred Buddhist Mountains of China. A rhizomatous perennial that resembles Begonia dielsiana, it is usually 0.5 m (20 in) tall, and is typically found growing amongst other scrubby vegetation alongside streams at elevations from 900 to 1,000 m (3,000 to 3,300 ft). The flowers are 4 cm (1.6 in) wide, and pale pink. Hardy to −10 °C, it is available from commercial suppliers.
