= Unaksan =

Mountain in Gyeonggi Province, South Korea

Coordinates: 37°52′41″N 127°19′30″E

Highest point
- Elevation: 935.5 m (3,069 ft)

Geography
- Location: South Korea

Korean name
- Hangul: 운악산
- Hanja: 雲岳山
- RR: Unaksan
- MR: Unaksan

Unaksan (Korean: 운악산) is a mountain in Gyeonggi Province, South Korea. Its area extends across Gapyeong County and the city Pocheon. It has an elevation of 935.5 m (3,069 ft).

== See also ==
- List of mountains in Korea
