= Beidiantou Township =

Beidiantou Township 北店头乡
- Rural Township
- Běidiàntóu Xiāng
- Location in Hebei Location in China
- Coordinates: 38°47′55″N 114°53′36″E
- Country: People's Republic of China
- Province: Hebei
- Prefecture-level city: Baoding
- County: Tang

Area
  - Total: 72.69 km^{2} (28.07 sq mi)

Population (2010)
  - Total: 30,559
  - Density: 420.4/km^{2} (1,089/sq mi)
- Time zone: UTC+8 (China Standard)

Beidiantou Township (Chinese: 北店头乡; pinyin: Běidiàntóu Xiāng) is a rural township located in Tang County, Baoding, Hebei, China. According to the 2010 census, Beidiantou Township had a population of 30,559, including 15,416 males and 15,143 females. The population was distributed as follows: 6,643 people aged under 14, 21,167 people aged between 15 and 64, and 2,749 people aged over 65.

== See also ==
- List of township-level divisions of Hebei
