= Longquanguan =

Longquanguan 龙泉关镇
- Town
- Lóngquánguān Zhèn
- Location in Hebei Location in China
- Coordinates: 38°55′09.7″N 113°50′59.3″E
- Country: People's Republic of China
- Province: Hebei
- Prefecture-level city: Baoding
- County: Fuping County

Area
  - Total: 145.7 km^{2} (56.3 sq mi)

Population (2010)
  - Total: 7,394
  - Density: 50.8/km^{2} (132/sq mi)
- Time zone: UTC+8 (China Standard)
- Area code: 312

Longquanguan (Chinese: 龙泉关镇; pinyin: Lóngquánguān Zhèn) is a town in Fuping County, under the jurisdiction of the prefecture-level city of Baoding in Hebei Province, China. As of the 2010 census, the town had a population of 7,394 living in a total area of 145.7 square kilometers, resulting in a population density of approximately 50.8 inhabitants per square kilometer.

The gender distribution was nearly equal in 2010, with 3,728 males (49.6%) and 3,666 females (50.4%). The age breakdown showed 18.3% (1,355) of the population were under the age of 15, 68.1% (5,038) were between 15 and 64, and 13.5% (1,001) were aged 65 and older.

== See also ==
- List of township-level divisions of Hebei
