= Five Mountains of Korea =

Mountains considered important in Korea

The Five Mountains of Korea (Korean: 오악; Hanja: 五嶽; RR: Oak; MR: Oak) are five renowned mountains in Korean culture.

== Joseon era ==
Kumgangsan, Myohyangsan, and Paektusan are under North Korean control, while Samgaksan (renamed Bukhansan) and Jirisan are under South Korean control.

- Center - Samgaksan (삼각산; 三角山)
- North - Paektusan (백두산; 白頭山)
- South - Jirisan (지리산; 智異山)
- East - Mount Kumgang (금강산; 金剛山)
- West - Myohyangsan (묘향산; 妙香山)

== Silla era ==
In Silla times, these mountains were considered as guardians of the country, so ceremonial rituals were held by these mountains. All of these mountains are within South Korea.

- Center - Palgongsan (팔공산; 八公山)
- North - Taebaeksan (태백산; 太白山)
- South - Jirisan (지리산; 智異山)
- East - Tohamsan (토함산; 吐含山)
- West - Gyeryongsan (계룡산; 鷄龍山)

== North Korean list ==
In North Korea, the following are known as the five famous mountains. Of them, only Jirisan is in South Korea.

- Paektusan (백두산; 白頭山)
- Kumgangsan (금강산; 金剛山)
- Myohyangsan (묘향산; 妙香山)
- Kuwolsan (구월산; 九月山)
- Jirisan (지리산; 智異山)

Occasionally a sixth one, Chilbosan (칠보산; 七寶山) in North Korea, is added to reach a list of six famous mountains.

== Five Peaks of Gyeonggi ==
These five mountains are considered as "the representative peaks of Gyeonggi Province". All of them are in South Korea, except Song'aksan which is in North Korean territory.

- Gamaksan (감악산; 紺岳山)
- Gwanaksan (관악산; 冠岳山)
- Hwaaksan (화악산; 華岳山)
- Song'aksan (송악산; 松岳山)
- Unaksan (운악산; 雲岳山)

== See also ==
- Sacred Mountains of China, for five sacred mountains revered in Chinese culture
- Baekdu-daegan, the mountain range that stretches down the length of the Korean peninsula
