= Beiguoyuan Township =

Beiguoyuan Township 北果元乡
- Township
- Běiguǒyuán Xiāng
- Location in Hebei Location in China
- Coordinates: 38°46′25.9″N 114°19′16.7″E
- Country: People's Republic of China
- Province: Hebei
- Prefecture-level city: Baoding
- County: Fuping County

Area
  - Total: 164.7 km^{2} (63.6 sq mi)

Population (2010)
  - Total: 20,585
  - Density: 125/km^{2} (320/sq mi)
- Time zone: UTC+8 (China Standard)
- Area code: 312

Beiguoyuan Township (Chinese: 北果元乡; pinyin: Běiguǒyuán Xiāng) is a rural township located in Fuping County, under the jurisdiction of Baoding, in Hebei Province, China. According to the 2010 census, it had a population of 20,585 people. It covers an area of 164.7 square kilometers, with a population density of approximately 125 inhabitants per square kilometer.

As of the 2010 census, the population consisted of 10,514 males (48.9%) and 10,071 females (51.1%). The age distribution was as follows: 4,471 individuals (21.7%) were aged 0–14, 14,245 (69.2%) were aged 15–64, and 1,869 (9.1%) were aged 65 and over.

== See also ==
- List of township-level divisions of Hebei
