= Datai Township =

Datai Township 大台乡
- Township
- Dàtái Xiāng
- Location in Hebei Location in China
- Coordinates: 38°59′06.6″N 114°23′13.7″E
- Country: People's Republic of China
- Province: Hebei
- Prefecture-level city: Baoding
- County: Fuping County

Area
  - Total: 181.3 km^{2} (70.0 sq mi)

Population (2010)
  - Total: 10,975
  - Density: 60.52/km^{2} (156.7/sq mi)
- Time zone: UTC+8 (China Standard)
- Area code: 312

Datai Township (Chinese: 大台乡; pinyin: Dàtái Xiāng) is a rural township located in Fuping County, under the jurisdiction of the city of Baoding in Hebei Province, China. As of the 2010 census, the township had a population of 10,975 residents living within a total area of 181.3 square kilometers, resulting in a population density of approximately 60.5 inhabitants per square kilometer.

According to demographic data from 2010, the population was composed of 5,643 males (48.6%) and 5,332 females (51.4%). In terms of age distribution, 20.6% (2,263 individuals) were 0–14 years old, 68.9% (7,563 individuals) were 15–64 years old, and 10.5% (1,149 individuals) were aged 65 and above.

== See also ==
- List of township-level divisions of Hebei
