= Tianshengqiao, Hebei =

Tianshengqiao 天生桥镇
- Town
- Tiānshēngqiáo Zhèn
- Location in Hebei Location in China
- Coordinates: 38°53′10.9″N 113°57′41.7″E
- Country: People's Republic of China
- Province: Hebei
- Prefecture-level city: Baoding
- County: Fuping County

Area
  - Total: 160.2 km^{2} (61.9 sq mi)

Population (2010)
  - Total: 9,151
  - Density: 57.1/km^{2} (148/sq mi)
- Time zone: UTC+8 (China Standard)
- Area code: 312

Tianshengqiao (Chinese: 天生桥镇; pinyin: Tiānshēngqiáo Zhèn) is a town located in Fuping County, within the jurisdiction of the prefecture-level city of Baoding, in Hebei Province, China. As of the 2010 Chinese census, it had a population of 9,151 residing in a total area of 160.2 square kilometers, yielding a population density of approximately 57.1 people per square kilometer.

In terms of demographic structure, the 2010 census recorded 4,633 males (49.4%) and 4,518 females (50.6%). Age distribution was as follows: 22.1% (2,021 people) aged 0–14 years, 66.9% (6,120) aged 15–64 years, and 11.0% (1,010) aged 65 years and over.

== See also ==
- List of township-level divisions of Hebei
