= Xin County =

Xin County 新县
- County
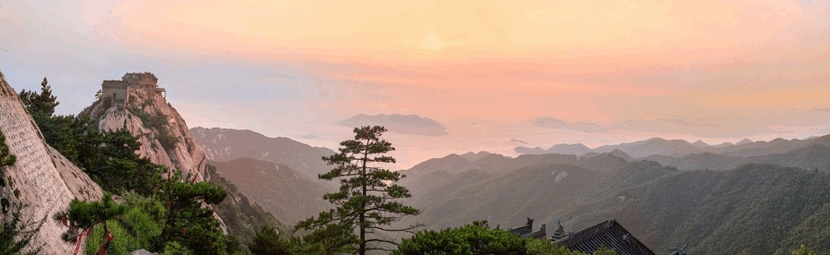
- Jinlanshan National Forest Park (金兰山国家森林公园)

- Location of the seat in Henan
- Coordinates: 31°38′38″N 114°52′44″E
- Country: People's Republic of China
- Province: Henan
- Prefecture-level city: Xinyang

Area
  - Total: 1,554 km^{2} (600 sq mi)

Population (2019)
  - Total: 289,200
  - Density: 186.1/km^{2} (482.0/sq mi)
- Time zone: UTC+8 (China Standard)
- Postal code: 465550
- Website: www.hnxx.gov.cn

Xin County or Xinxian (Chinese: 新县; pinyin: Xīn Xiàn) is a county in the southeast of Henan province, China, bordering Hubei province to the south. It is under the administration of the prefecture-level city of Xinyang.

== Administrative divisions ==
As of 2012, this county is divided to 5 towns and 10 townships.

Towns

- Xinji (新集镇)
- Shawo (沙窝镇)
- Balifan (八里畈镇)
- Wuchenhe (吴陈河镇)
- Suhe (苏河镇)

Townships

- Zhouhe Township (周河乡)
- Huwan Township (浒湾乡)
- Qianjin Township (千斤乡)
- Chendian Township (陈店乡)
- Kafang Township (卡房乡)
- Guojiahe Township (郭家河乡)
- Jianchanghe Township (箭厂河乡)
- Sidian Township (泗店乡)
- Doushanhe Township (陡山河乡)
- Tianpu Township (田铺乡)

== Climate ==
Climate data for Xinxian, elevation 129 m (423 ft), (1991–2020 normals, extremes 1981–2010)
Month	Jan	Feb	Mar	Apr	May	Jun	Jul	Aug	Sep	Oct	Nov	Dec	Year
Record high °C (°F)	19.7 (67.5)	26.9 (80.4)	30.6 (87.1)	33.6 (92.5)	37.2 (99.0)	38.3 (100.9)	41.1 (106.0)	38.0 (100.4)	37.1 (98.8)	32.4 (90.3)	28.9 (84.0)	22.7 (72.9)	41.1 (106.0)
Mean daily maximum °C (°F)	7.1 (44.8)	10.3 (50.5)	15.6 (60.1)	22.0 (71.6)	26.5 (79.7)	29.5 (85.1)	31.7 (89.1)	30.9 (87.6)	27.2 (81.0)	22.0 (71.6)	15.8 (60.4)	9.5 (49.1)	20.7 (69.2)
Daily mean °C (°F)	2.5 (36.5)	5.3 (41.5)	10.3 (50.5)	16.3 (61.3)	21.1 (70.0)	24.7 (76.5)	27.4 (81.3)	26.4 (79.5)	22.0 (71.6)	16.3 (61.3)	10.2 (50.4)	4.6 (40.3)	15.6 (60.1)
Mean daily minimum °C (°F)	−0.7 (30.7)	1.7 (35.1)	6.1 (43.0)	11.7 (53.1)	16.7 (62.1)	20.9 (69.6)	24.1 (75.4)	23.2 (73.8)	18.3 (64.9)	12.2 (54.0)	6.2 (43.2)	1.0 (33.8)	11.8 (53.2)
Record low °C (°F)	−12.6 (9.3)	−10.5 (13.1)	−5.9 (21.4)	−0.1 (31.8)	5.0 (41.0)	9.7 (49.5)	17.3 (63.1)	14.4 (57.9)	7.4 (45.3)	−0.8 (30.6)	−6.6 (20.1)	−17.0 (1.4)	−17.0 (1.4)
Average precipitation mm (inches)	41.7 (1.64)	48.9 (1.93)	77.6 (3.06)	104.4 (4.11)	129.1 (5.08)	205.3 (8.08)	246.6 (9.71)	151.2 (5.95)	78.0 (3.07)	78.2 (3.08)	51.7 (2.04)	30.0 (1.18)	1,242.7 (48.93)
Average precipitation days (≥ 0.1 mm)	8.3	9.5	10.6	10.5	12.0	11.3	12.9	13.0	9.8	9.4	8.9	6.6	122.8
Average snowy days	4.9	2.9	1.2	0	0	0	0	0	0	0	0.7	2.0	11.7
Average relative humidity (%)	73	73	70	70	74	79	81	83	80	77	75	71	76
Mean monthly sunshine hours	101.3	103.0	129.2	157.7	163.3	150.2	173.1	165.2	142.8	139.9	130.5	117.2	1,673.4
Percentage possible sunshine	32	33	35	41	38	35	40	40	39	40	42	38	38
Source: China Meteorological Administration
