= Fanjiazhuang Township =

Fanjiazhuang Township 范家庄乡
- Rural Township
- Fànjiāzhuāng Xiāng
- Location in Hebei Location in China
- Coordinates: 38°54′56″N 114°37′12″E
- Country: People's Republic of China
- Province: Hebei
- Prefecture-level city: Baoding
- County: Quyang

Area
  - Total: 46.29 km^{2} (17.87 sq mi)

Population (2010)
  - Total: 9,100
  - Density: 196.6/km^{2} (509/sq mi)
- Time zone: UTC+8 (China Standard)

Fanjiazhuang Township (Chinese: 范家庄乡; pinyin: Fànjiāzhuāng Xiāng) is a rural township located in Quyang County, Baoding, Hebei, China. According to the 2010 census, Fanjiazhuang Township had a population of 9,100, including 4,693 males and 4,407 females. The population was distributed as follows: 2,053 people aged under 14, 6,465 people aged between 15 and 64, and 582 people aged over 65.

== See also ==
- List of township-level divisions of Hebei
