= Chande Township =

Chande Township 产德乡
- Rural Township
- Chǎndé Xiāng
- Location in Hebei Location in China
- Coordinates: 38°38′47″N 114°35′13″E
- Country: People's Republic of China
- Province: Hebei
- Prefecture-level city: Baoding
- County: Quyang

Area
  - Total: 79.44 km^{2} (30.67 sq mi)

Population (2010)
  - Total: 33,597
  - Density: 422.9/km^{2} (1,095/sq mi)
- Time zone: UTC+8 (China Standard)

Chande Township (Chinese: 产德乡; pinyin: Chǎndé Xiāng) is a rural township located in Quyang County, Baoding, Hebei, China. According to the 2010 census, Chande Township had a population of 33,597, including 17,280 males and 16,317 females. The population was distributed as follows: 7,180 people aged under 14, 24,163 people aged between 15 and 64, and 2,254 people aged over 65.

== See also ==
- List of township-level divisions of Hebei
