= Wuwangkou Township =

Wuwangkou Township 吴王口乡
- Township
- Wúwángkŏu Xiāng
- Location in Hebei Location in China
- Coordinates: 39°02′38.4″N 114°01′23.3″E
- Country: People's Republic of China
- Province: Hebei
- Prefecture-level city: Baoding
- County: Fuping County

Area
  - Total: 220.0 km^{2} (84.9 sq mi)

Population (2010)
  - Total: 4,276
  - Density: 19.44/km^{2} (50.3/sq mi)
- Time zone: UTC+8 (China Standard)
- Area code: 312

Wuwangkou Township (Chinese: 吴王口乡; pinyin: Wúwángkǒu Xiāng) is a rural township in Fuping County, administered by the city of Baoding in Hebei Province, China. As of the 2010 census, it had a population of 4,276 residing in a total area of 220.0 square kilometers, resulting in a population density of approximately 19.44 inhabitants per square kilometer.

At the time of the 2010 census, the township's population was composed of 2,214 males (48.2%) and 2,062 females (51.8%). Age distribution included 790 people (18.5%) aged 0–14, 2,769 people (64.8%) aged 15–64, and 717 people (16.8%) aged 65 and above.

== See also ==
- List of township-level divisions of Hebei
