= Chuanli =

Chuanli 川里镇
- Town
- Chuānlǐ Zhèn
- Location in Hebei Location in China
- Coordinates: 39°04′04″N 114°42′53″E
- Country: People's Republic of China
- Province: Hebei
- Prefecture-level city: Baoding
- County: Tang

Area
  - Total: 95.88 km^{2} (37.02 sq mi)

Population (2010)
  - Total: 9,340
  - Density: 97.41/km^{2} (252.3/sq mi)
- Time zone: UTC+8 (China Standard)

Chuanli (Chinese: 川里镇; pinyin: Chuānlǐ Zhèn) is a town located in Tang County, Baoding, Hebei, China. According to the 2010 census, Chuanli had a population of 9,340, including 4,742 males and 4,598 females. The population was distributed as follows: 1,781 people aged under 14, 6,772 people aged between 15 and 64, and 787 people aged over 65.

== See also ==
- List of township-level divisions of Hebei
