= Yangping, Hebei =

Yangping 羊平
- Town
- 羊平镇
- Interactive map of Yangping
- Coordinates: 38°31′45″N 114°42′51″E
- Country: People's Republic of China
- Province: Hebei
- Prefecture-level city: Baoding
- County: Quyang County

Area
  - Total: 90 km^{2} (35 sq mi)

Population
  - Total: 38,000
  - Density: 420/km^{2} (1,100/sq mi)
- Time zone: UTC+8 (China Standard Time)
- Postal code: 073102
- Area code: (0)0312

Yangping (Chinese: 羊平; pinyin: Yángpíng) is a town in Quyang County, Hebei, China. It is located in the south of the county, 10 kilometres (6.2 mi) from the county seat. In 1961 it was formed as a commune (羊平公社), and in 1985, the commune was abolished and turned into a township (Yangping Township; 羊平乡). Finally, in 1991, it was renamed as a town and remains so today. The primary industries in the area are engraving and plate processing, while the main agricultural products are wheat and corn.

== Administrative divisions ==
There are 13 villages in the town: South Guzhang (南故张村), North Guzhang (北故张村), South West Yangping (西羊平南村), Central West Yangping (西羊平中村), North West Yangping (西羊平北村), East Yangping (东羊平村), Xiguo (西郭村), Tunzhuang (屯庄村), Anxia (岸下村), South Yangma (南养马村), North Yangma (北养马村), Tianzhuang (田庄村), Yuantan (元坦村)

== See also ==
- List of township-level divisions of Hebei
