= Gaochang (town) =

Gaochang 高昌镇
- Town
- Gāochāng Zhèn
- Location in Hebei Location in China
- Coordinates: 38°46′57″N 115°02′10″E
- Country: People's Republic of China
- Province: Hebei
- Prefecture-level city: Baoding
- County: Tang

Area
  - Total: 55.31 km^{2} (21.36 sq mi)

Population (2010)
  - Total: 31,750
  - Density: 574/km^{2} (1,490/sq mi)
- Time zone: UTC+8 (China Standard)

Gaochang (Chinese: 高昌镇; pinyin: Gāochāng Zhèn) is a town located in Tang County, Baoding, Hebei, China. According to the 2010 census, Gaochang had a population of 31,750, including 15,479 males and 16,271 females. The population was distributed as follows: 6,735 people aged under 14, 22,135 people aged between 15 and 64, and 2,880 people aged over 65.

== See also ==
- List of township-level divisions of Hebei
