= Pingyang, Hebei =

Pingyang 平阳镇
- Town
- Píngyáng Zhèn
- Location in Hebei Location in China
- Coordinates: 38°49′08.0″N 114°28′34.2″E
- Country: People's Republic of China
- Province: Hebei
- Prefecture-level city: Baoding
- County: Fuping County

Area
  - Total: 183.7 km^{2} (70.9 sq mi)

Population (2010)
  - Total: 24,036
  - Density: 130.9/km^{2} (339/sq mi)
- Time zone: UTC+8 (China Standard)
- Area code: 312

Pingyang (Chinese: 平阳镇; pinyin: Píngyáng Zhèn) is a town located in Fuping County, under the administration of the prefecture-level city of Baoding, in Hebei Province, China. As of the 2010 census, it had a population of 24,036 living in a total area of 183.7 square kilometers, giving it a population density of about 130.9 people per square kilometer.

The gender distribution in 2010 was nearly even, with 12,154 males (49.4%) and 11,882 females (50.6%). The age structure included 23.9% (5,754) under 15 years old, 68.4% (16,440) between 15 and 64, and 7.7% (1,842) aged 65 or older.

== See also ==
- List of township-level divisions of Hebei
