= Sacred Mountains of China =

Famous mountains in Chinese history

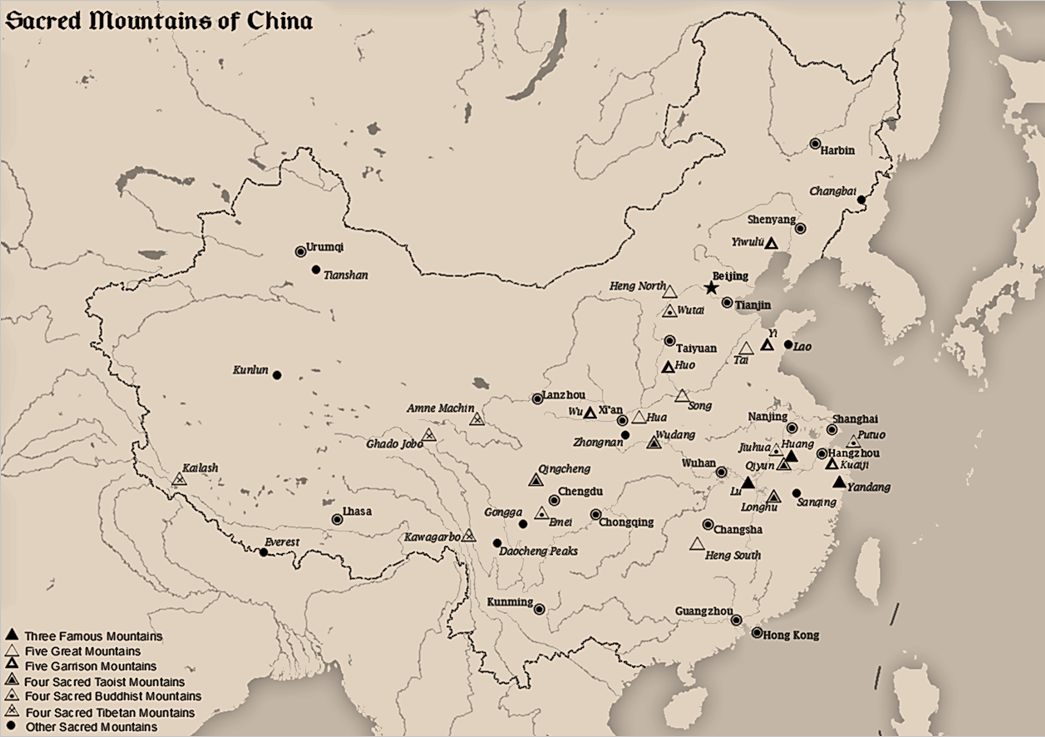
Locations of the Sacred Mountains of China

The Sacred Mountains of China are divided into several groups. The Five Great Mountains (simplified Chinese: 五岳; traditional Chinese: 五嶽; pinyin: Wǔyuè) refers to five of the most renowned mountains in Chinese history, which have been the subjects of imperial pilgrimage by emperors throughout ages. They are associated with the supreme God of Heaven and the five main cosmic deities of traditional Chinese religion. The group associated with Buddhism is referred to as the Four Sacred Mountains of Buddhism (四大佛教名山; Sì dà fójiào míngshān), and the group associated with Taoism is referred to as the Four Sacred Mountains of Taoism (四大道教名山; Sì dà dàojiào míngshān).

The sacred mountains have all been important destinations for pilgrimage, the Chinese term for pilgrimage (朝圣; 朝聖; cháoshèng) being a shortened version of an expression which means "paying respect to a holy mountain" (朝拜圣山; 朝拜聖山; cháobài shèng shān).

== The Five Great Mountains ==
The five elements, cosmic deities, historical incarnations, chthonic and dragon gods, and planets, associated to the five sacred mountains. This Chinese religious cosmology shows the Yellow Emperor, god of the earth and the year, as the centre of the cosmos, and the four gods of the directions and the seasons as his emanations. The diagram is based on the Huainanzi.

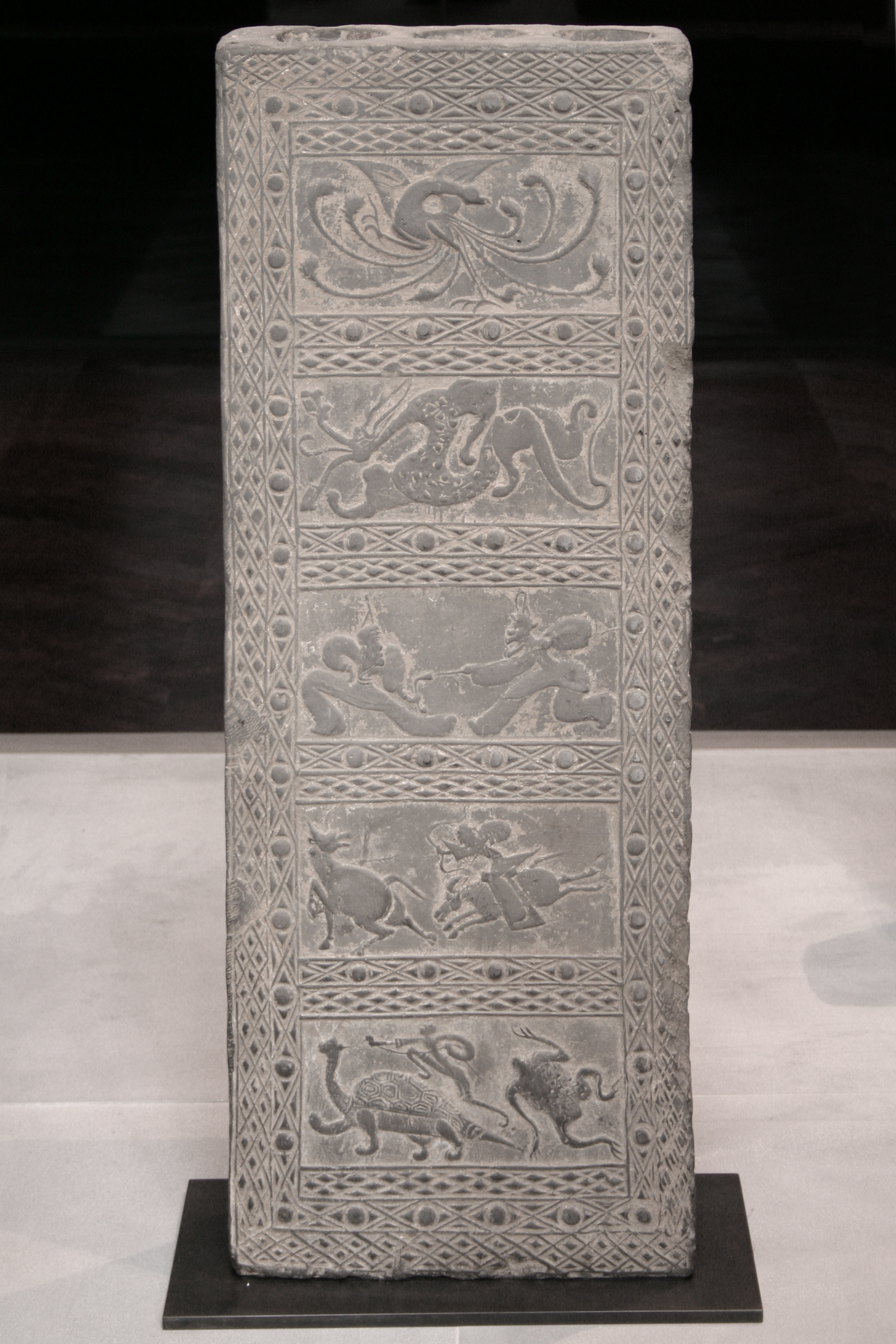
A Han dynasty tile emblematically representing the five cardinal directions.

The Five Great Mountains (五岳) are arranged according to the five cardinal directions of Chinese geomancy, which includes the center as a direction. The grouping of the five mountains appeared during the Warring States period (475–221 BC), and the term Wuyue ("Five Summits") was made popular during the reign of the Wu Emperor of the Han dynasty (140–87 BC). In Chinese traditional religion they have cosmological and theological significance as the representation, on the physical plane of earth, of the ordered world emanating from the God of Heaven (Shangdi or Tian), inscribing the Chinese territory as an altar (壇, tán), equivalent to the Indo-Buddhist mandala.

The five mountains are among the best-known natural landmarks in Chinese history and, since the early periods in Chinese history, they have been the ritual sites of imperial worship and sacrifice. In Chinese legend, the first sovereigns and emperors of China went on excursions or formed processions to the summits of the Five Great Mountains. Every visit took place at the same time of the year. The excursions were hunting trips and ended in ritual offerings to the reigning god.

Historical emperors, starting with the First Emperor of the Qin, formalized these expeditions and incorporated them into state ritual. With every new dynasty, the new emperor hurried to the Five Great Mountains in order to lay claim to his newly acquired domains. Despite unavoidable interruptions, this imperial custom was preserved until the end of the last dynasty, when, after the fall of the Qing dynasty in 1911, Yuan Shikai had himself crowned as emperor at the Temple of Heaven in Beijing. But just to be safe, he also made an offer to the god of the northern Mount Heng.

In the 2000s formal sacrifices both in Confucian and Taoist styles have been resumed. The Five Great Mountains have become places of pilgrimage where hundreds of pilgrims gather in temples and caves. Although the Five Great Mountains are not traditionally canonized as having any exclusive religious affiliations, many of them have a strong Taoist presence, thus the five mountains are also grouped by some as part of the "Sacred Taoist Mountains". There are also various Buddhist temples and Confucian academies built on these mountains.

Alternatively, these mountains are sometimes referred to by the respective directions: the "Northern Great Mountain" (北岳; 北嶽; Běi Yuè), "Southern Great Mountain" (南岳; 南嶽; Nán Yuè), "Eastern Great Mountain" (东岳; 東嶽; Dōng Yuè), "Western Great Mountain" (西岳; 西嶽; Xī Yuè), and "Central Great Mountain" (中岳; 中嶽; Zhōng Yuè).

According to Chinese mythology, the Five Great Mountains originated from the body of Pangu, the first being and the creator of the world. Because of its eastern location, Mount Tai is associated with the rising sun which signifies birth and renewal. Due to this interpretation, it is often regarded as the most sacred of the mountains. In accordance with its special position, Mount Tai has been considered to have been formed out of Pangu's head. Mount Heng in Hunan from his right arm, Mount Heng in Shanxi from his left arm, Mount Song from his belly, and Mount Hua from his feet.

=== Nature conservation ===
In ancient times mountains were places of authority and fear, ruled by dark forces and faithfully worshipped. One reason for such worship was the value of the mountains to human existence as a spring of welfare and fertility, as the birthplace of rivers, as a place where herbs and medicinal plants grew and as a source of materials to build houses and tools. A basic element of Taoist thought was, and still is, an intuitive feeling of connectedness with nature. As early as the fourth century, the Taoists presented the high priests with the 180 precepts of Lord Lao for how to live a good and honest life. Twenty of these precepts focused explicitly on the conservation of nature, while many other precepts were indirectly aimed at preventing the destruction of nature. Respect for nature has been a key component of Taoism from the very outset and, in its own right, explains why the Five Great Mountains are considered sacred. In addition, Taoists consider mountains as a means of communication between heaven and earth and as the place where immortality can be found. The sanctity of the Five Great Mountains is the reason why even today these mountains still host an exceptional diversity of plants, trees and animal species.

=== Eastern Mountain: Mount Tai ===
"Grand" or "Exalted Mountain" (泰山) Shandong, 1,545 m (5,069 ft) 36°15′N 117°06′E This mountain is associated with Feng Shan and by extension the Mandate of Heaven and life or death, being the most important of all the mountains

=== Western Mountain: Mount Hua ===
"Splendid Mountain" (华山; 華山), Shaanxi, 2,154 m (7,067 ft) 34°29′N 110°05′E

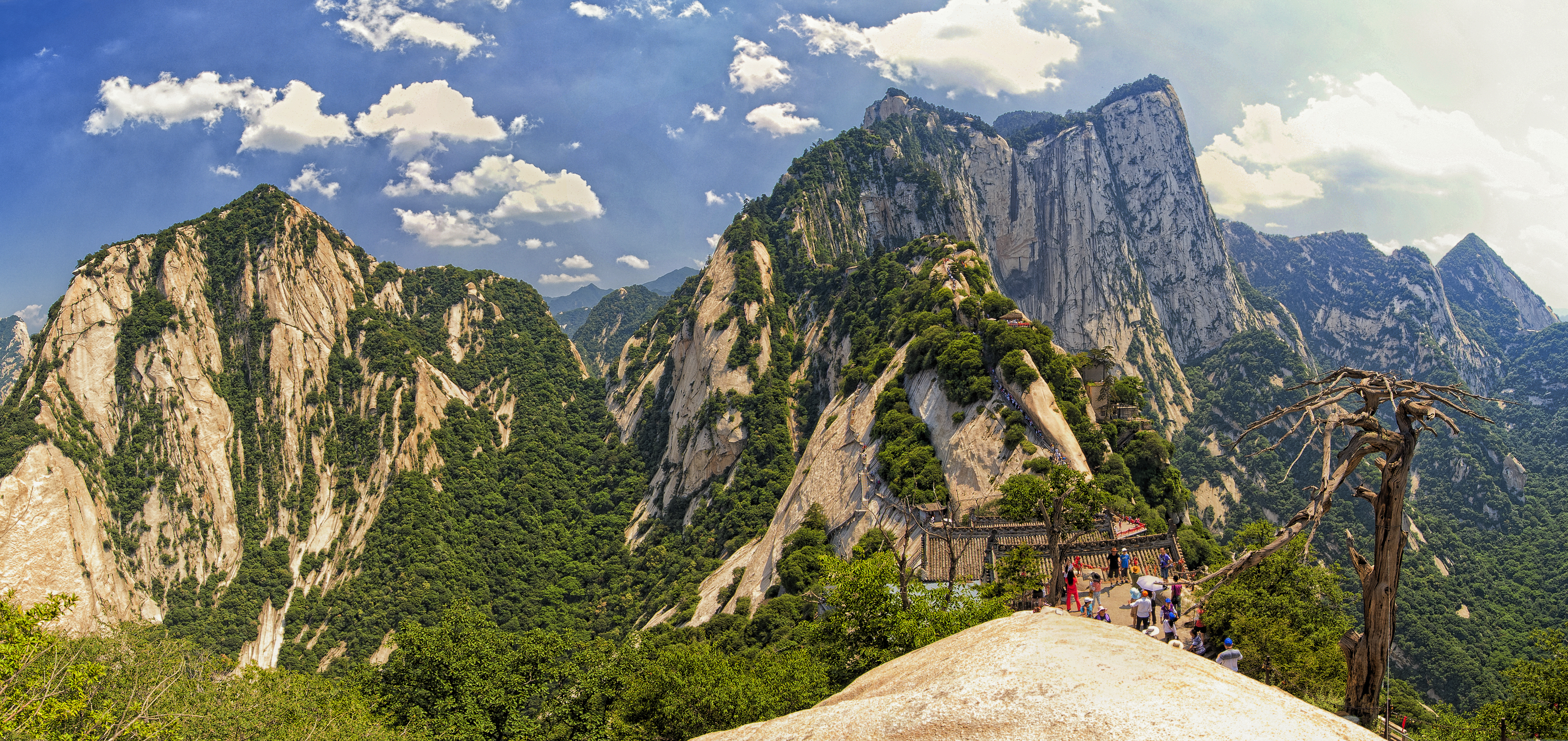
Huà Shān

=== Southern Mountain: Mount Heng (Hunan) ===
"Balancing" or "Balanced Mountain" (衡山), Hunan, 1,290 m (4,230 ft) 27.254798°N 112.655743°E

=== Northern Mountain: Mount Heng (Shanxi) ===
"Permanent Mountain" (恒山; 恆山), Shanxi, 2,017 m (6,617 ft) 39°40′26″N 113°44′08″E

In the course of history, there had been more than one location with the designation for Mount Heng, the North Great Mountain.

The Great Northern Mountain was designated on the original Mount Heng with the main peak known as Mount Damao (大茂山) today, located at the intersection of present-day Fuping County, Laiyuan County and Tang County in Hebei province.

Mount Heng was renamed Mount Chang (常山) to avoid the taboo of sharing the same personal name as Emperor Wen of Han. The appellations Heng and Chang were used extensively in the past to name various districts in the region, such as Changshan Prefecture (常山郡), Hengshan Prefecture (恒山郡), and Hengzhou (恒州).

While it was customary of the ethnic Han emperors to order rites to be performed regularly to honour the Five Great Mountains, the location of the original Mount Heng meant that for much of the eras of fragmentation, the region was either under non-Han rulers or a contested area. The shrines built to perform the rites were neglected and damaged from time and natural disasters. The decline was especially acute after the overthrow of the Yuan dynasty when the local population fell sharply after the wars.

This created opportunities for Ming dynasty officials who were natives of Shanxi to spread rumours that the spirit of Mount Heng had abandoned the original location and settled on Xuanwu Mountain in Hunyuan County in Shanxi. Between the reigns of Emperor Hongzhi and Emperor Wanli, they kept petitioning the emperors to declare the change and decree for the rites for the Northern Great Mountain to be shifted there. In 1586, Emperor Wanli opted a compromise by re-designating the Xuanwu Mountain as Mount Heng, but ordered the relevant rites to continue to be performed in the historic Beiyue Temple.

The movement for the change persisted after the demise of the Ming dynasty and rise of the Qing. Finally, Emperor Shunzhi consented to have the rites to be moved to Shanxi as well.

=== Central Mountain: Mount Song ===
"Lofty Mountain" (嵩山), Henan, 1,494 m (4,902 ft) 34°29′5″N 112°57′37″E

== Sacred Mountains of Buddhism ==
=== Four Sacred Mountains of China ===
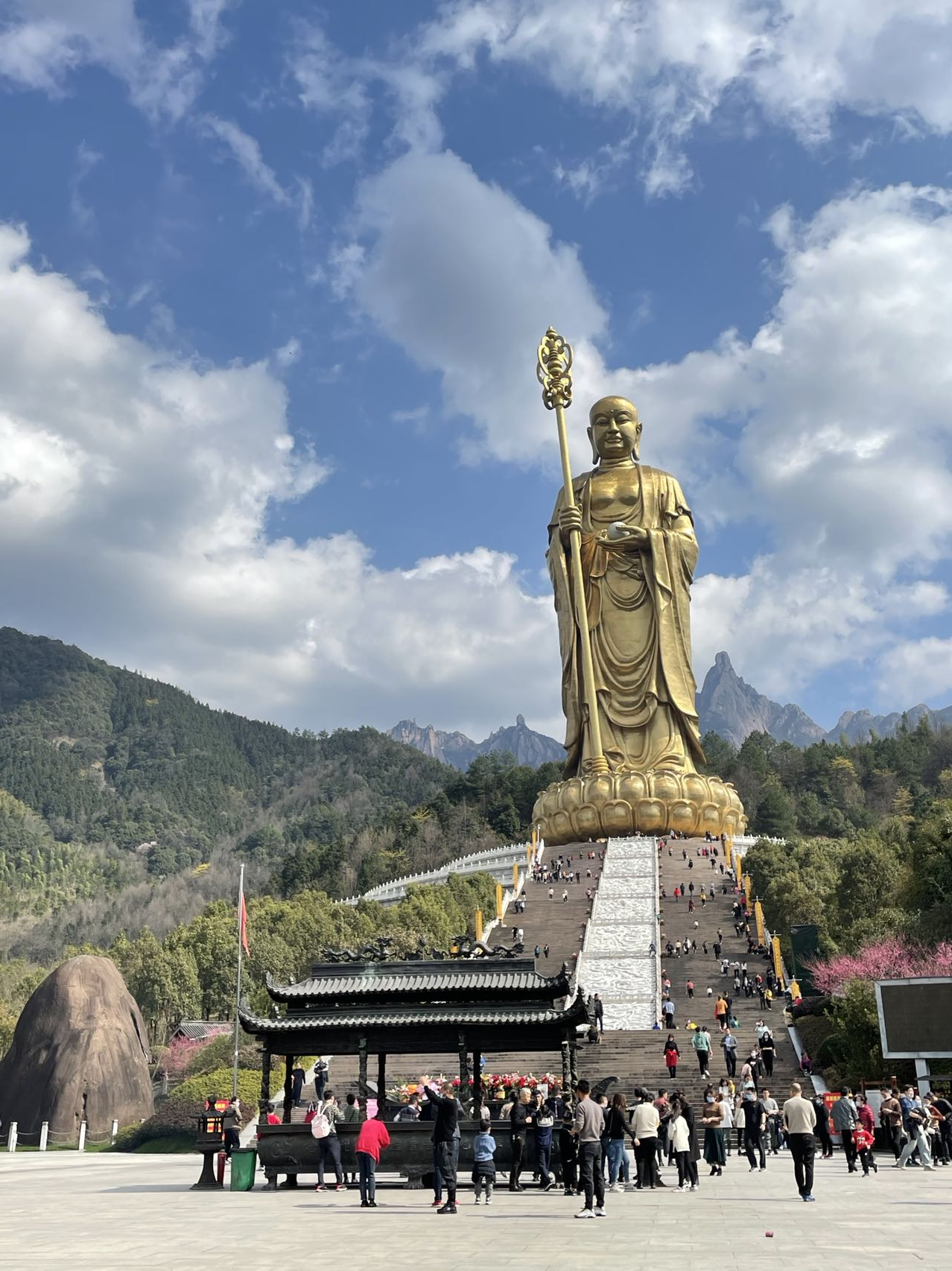
A view of the 99-meter statue of Ksitigarbha Bodhisattva at Jiuhuashan

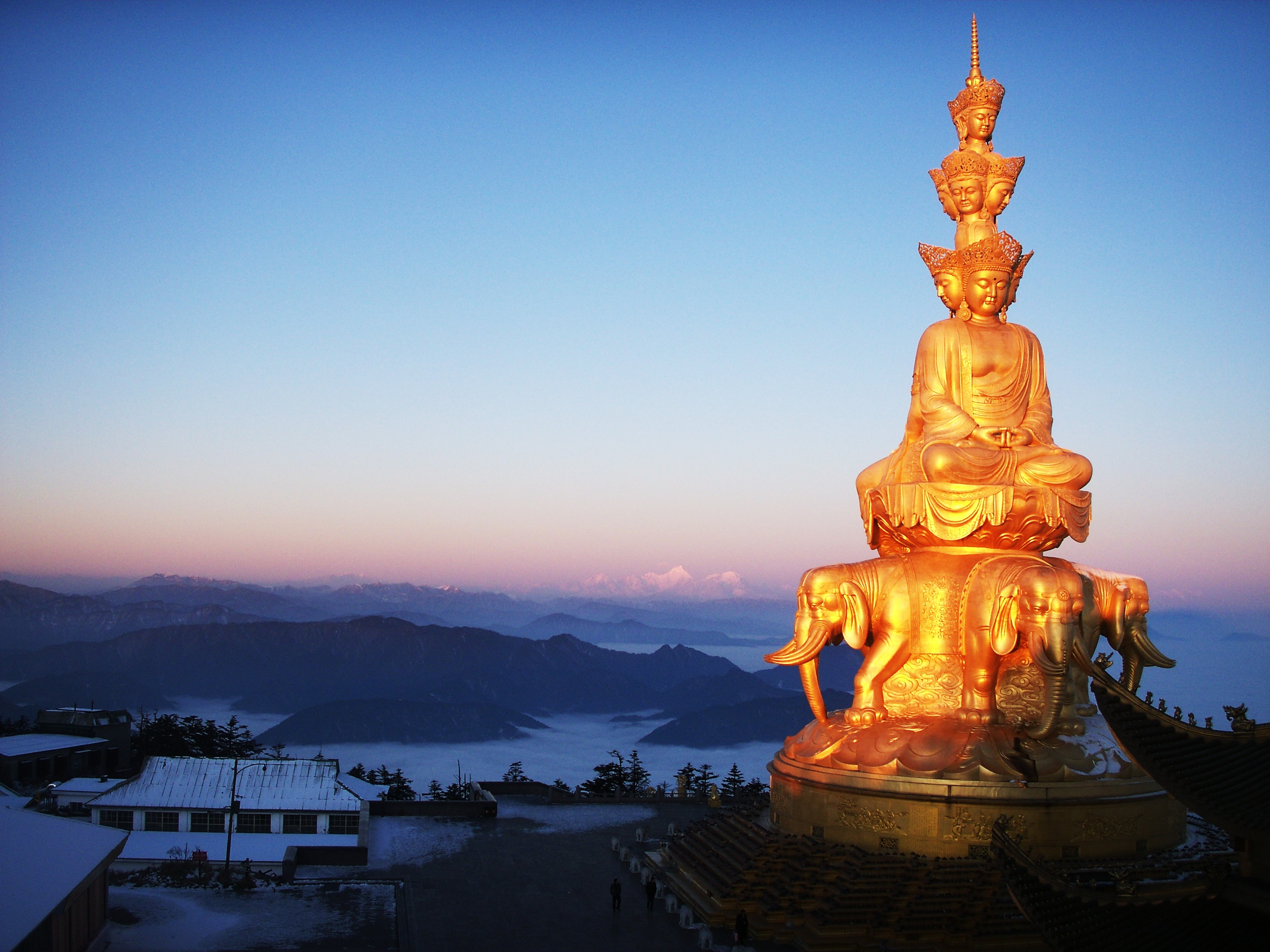
Mount Emei panorama with statue of Samantabhadra

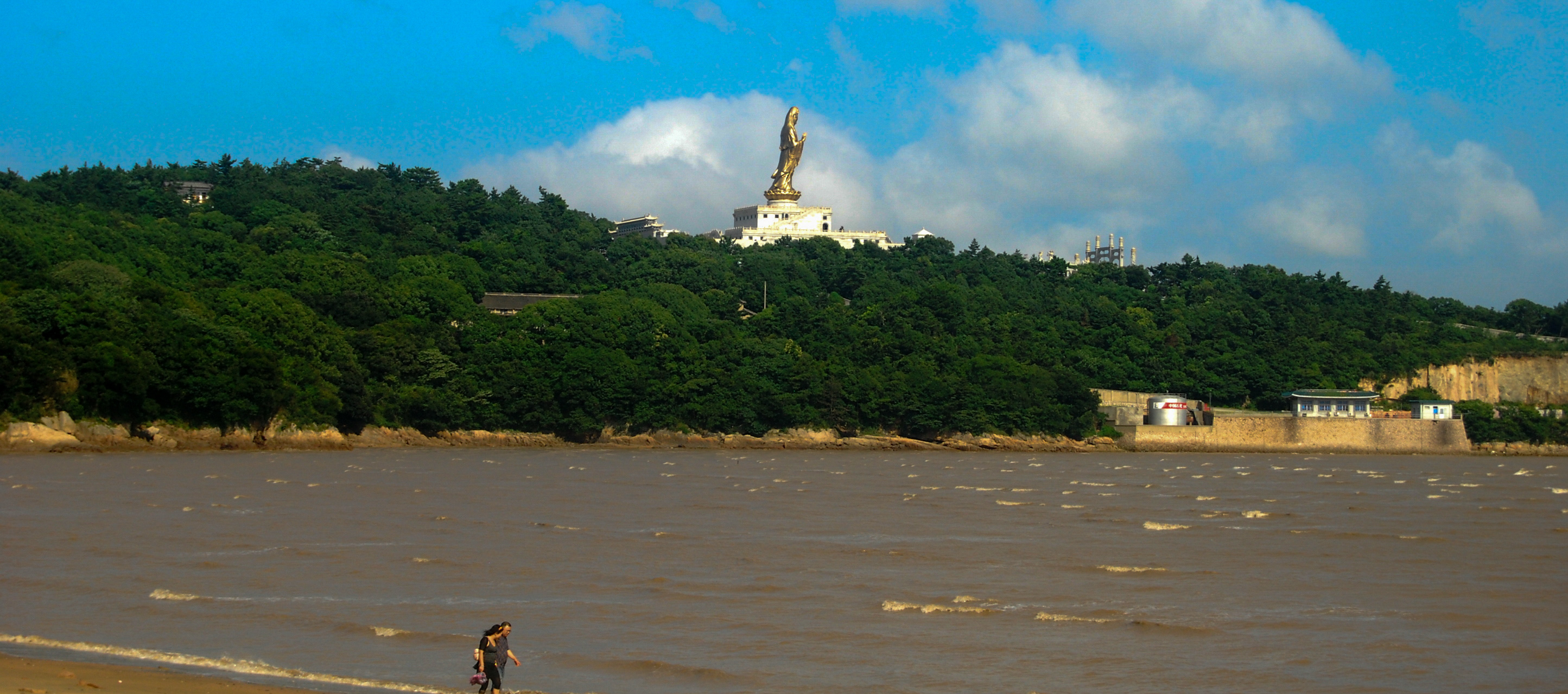
Guanyin statue, Mount Putuo

In Chinese Buddhism, the Four "Sacred Mountains of China" are:

==== Mount Wutai ====
"Five-Platform Mountain" (五台山), Shanxi, 3,058 m (10,033 ft), 39°04′45″N 113°33′53″E

Wutai is seen as the home of the Bodhisattva of wisdom, Manjusri or Wenshu (文殊) in Chinese.

==== Mount Emei ====
"High and Lofty Mountain" (峨嵋山), Sichuan, 3,099 m (10,167 ft)

The patron bodhisattva of Emei is Samantabhadra, known in Chinese as Puxian (普贤菩萨).

==== Mount Jiuhua ====
"Nine Glories Mountain" (九华山; 九華山), Anhui, 1,341 m (4,400 ft), 30°28′56″N 117°48′16″E

Many of the mountain's shrines and temples are dedicated to Ksitigarbha (known in Chinese as Dìzàng, 地藏, in Japanese as Jizō), who is a bodhisattva and protector of beings in hell realms.

==== Mount Putuo ====
"Mount Potalaka (Sanskrit)" (普陀山), Zhejiang, 284 m (932 ft) 30°00′35″N 122°23′06″E

This mountain is considered the bodhimanda of Avalokitesvara (Guan Yin), bodhisattva of compassion. It became a popular pilgrimage site and received imperial support in the Song dynasty.

=== Other sacred mountains ===
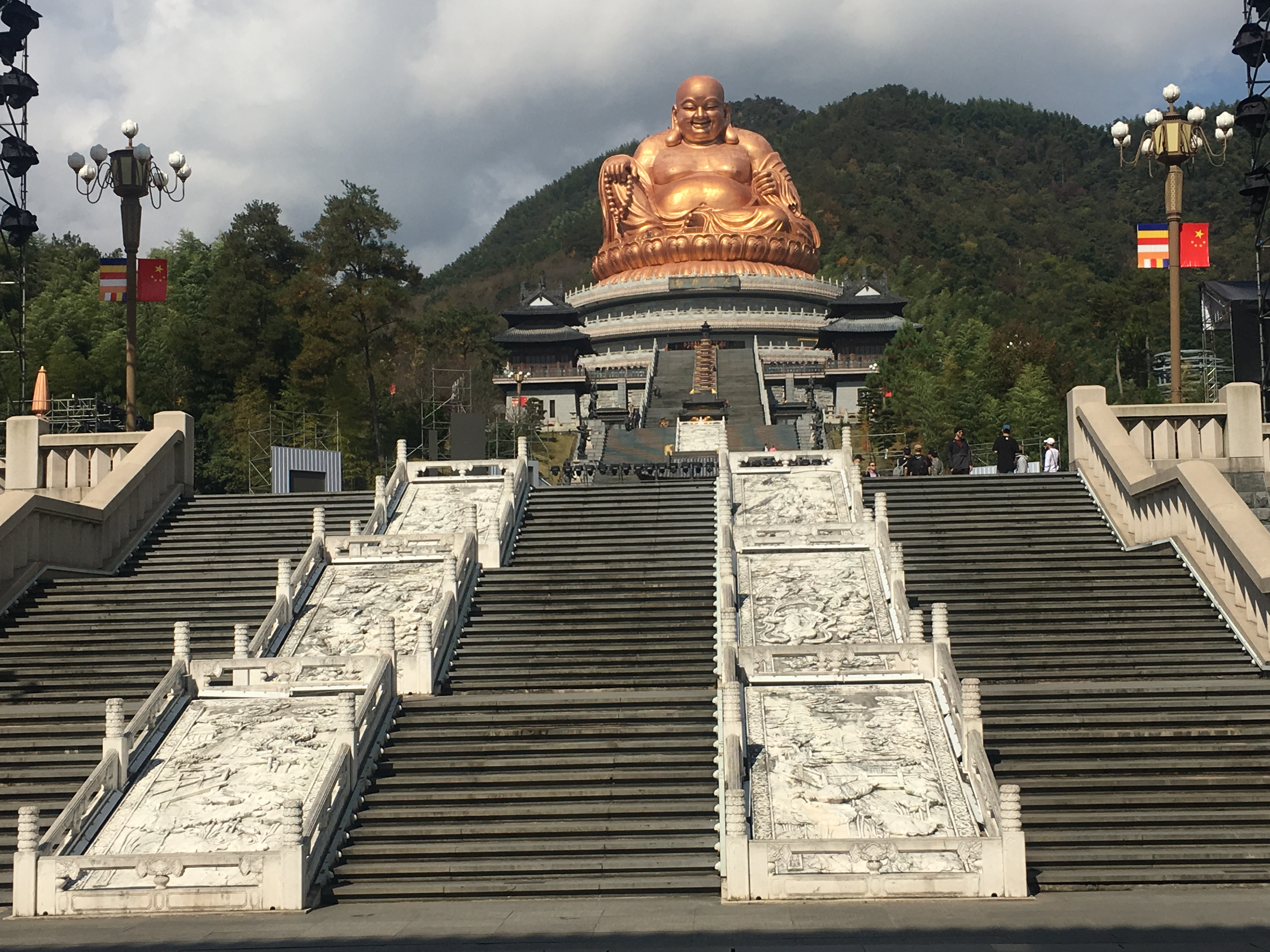
Statue of Maitreya - Budai called "Human Realm Maitreya" in Mt. Xuedou.

Mount Xuedou has been recently promoted as a fifth sacred mountain of Chinese Buddhism. This was first advocated by Changxing (1896–1939), an associate of the famous reformer Taixu. Xuedou mountain is seen as the sacred place of bodhisattva Maitreya. It is located 8 kilometers north-west of Xikou Town, Fenghua City, Zhejiang. Mount Xuedou is home to the newly expanded Xuedou monastery, which was originally founded during the Jin dynasty and is connected with the eccentric monk named Budai, who is considered to have been an emanation of Maitreya.

Fanjingshan (梵净山; Fànjìngshān), part of the Wuling Mountains in Tongren, Guizhou, is another sacred mountain associated with Maitreya. It is also a UNESCO World Heritage Site. Fanjing shan is also often claimed to be the fifth sacred mountain of Chinese Buddhism.

Mount Lu is also an important sacred mountain in Chinese Buddhism, especially for Pure Land Buddhism. It is the site Donglin Temple, founded by the Pure Land patriarch Huiyuan.

There are also sacred mountains in Tibetan Buddhism, which are considered holy sites of Tibetan Buddhism.

==== Five Mountains of Chan Buddhism ====
Chan Buddhism developed the Five Mountains and Ten Temples System (五山十刹, wushan shicha) during the late Southern Song (1127–1279).

The five mountains where the top Chan monasteries in the empire were located were:

- Lingyin Temple (灵隐寺, Lingyin si) on Lingyin mountain, Hang prefecture, Qiantang county
- Jingci Temple (净慈寺, Jingci si) on Nanping mountain, Hang prefecture, Qiantang county
- Jingshan Temple (径山寺, Jingshan si) on Jing mountain, Hang prefecture, Lin'an county
- Tiantong Temple (天童寺, Tiantong si) on Tiantong mountain, Ming prefecture, Yin county
- Ayuwang Temple (阿育王寺, Ayuwang si) on Ayuwang mountain, Ming prefecture, Yin county

==== Four Holy Mountains of Tibetan Buddhism ====
The Four Holy Mountains of Tibetan Buddhism, located in Yunnan, Qinghai, and the Tibet Autonomous Region, are:

- Amne Machin
- Kailash
- Ghado Jobo
- Kawagarbo

== The Four Sacred Mountains of Taoism ==
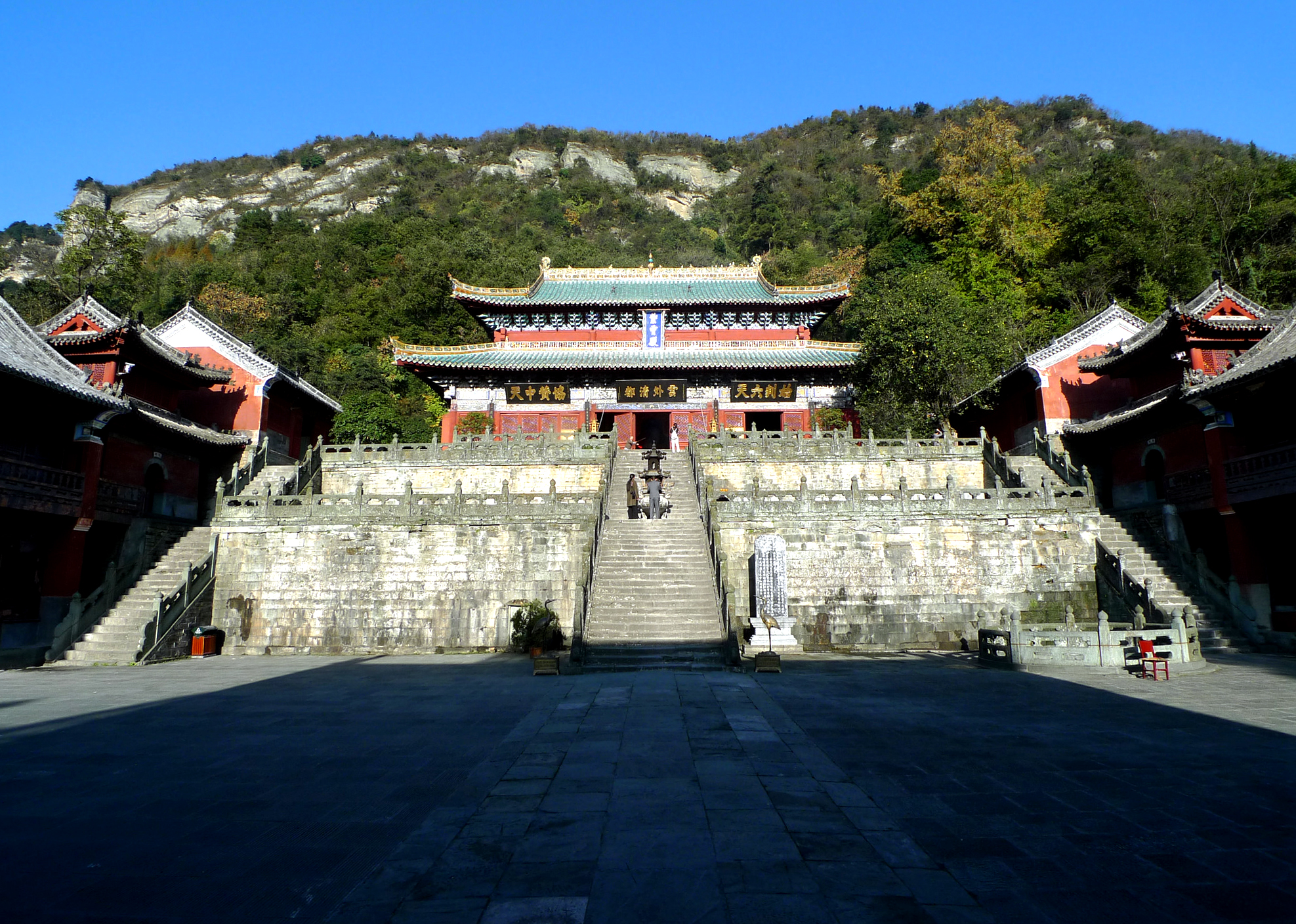
The Wudang Mountains

The "Four Sacred Mountains" of Taoism are:

=== Mount Wudang ===
Literally "Military Wherewithal" (武当山; 武當山); northwestern Hubei. Main peak: 1,612 m (5,289 ft). 32°40′0″N 111°00′4″E.

It is the home to a complex of Taoist temples and monasteries associated with the Lord of the North, Xuantian Shangdi. It is also renowned as being the place of origin for Tai chi.

=== Mount Longhu ===
Literally "Dragon and Tiger" (龙虎山; 龍虎山), Jiangxi. Main peak: 247.4 m (812 ft). 28°06′48.999″N 116°57′29.998″E

It is famous for being one of the birthplaces of Taoism and particularly important to the Zhengyi Dao, with many Taoist temples built upon the mountainside.

=== Qíyún Shān ===
Literally "Neat Clouds" (齐云山; 齊雲山), Anhui. Main peak: 585 m (1,919 ft). 29°48′29.9988″N 118°01′56.9994″E

=== Qīngchéng Shān ===
Literally "Misty Green City Wall" (青城山); (Nearby city: Dujiangyan, Sichuan. Main peak: 1,260 m (4,130 ft) (surveyed in 2007). In ancient Chinese history, Mount Qingcheng area was famous for being for "The most secluded place in China". 30°58′35.73″N 103°30′59.90″E.

== Three Mountains ==
The term "Three Mountains" (三山) has varied meanings.

=== Three Sacred Mountains ===
The Three Sacred Mountains commonly refer to:

1. Mount Tian - "Mountains of God/Heaven"; sacred in Tengrism
2. Mount Changbai - tallest mountain in Northeast China, also regarded by Manchus of the Qing dynasty as Holy Mountain
3. Kunlun Mountains - nicknamed the "Forefather of Mountains" in China; it is also the location of the peach tree of immortality wardened by Xiwangmu, the Queen Mother of the West

=== Three Famous Mountains ===
The Three Famous Mountains are:

1. Mount Lu
2. Mount Huang
3. Yandang

=== Three Holy Mountains in Yading ===
The Three Holy Mountain Peaks at Yading, Daocheng County:

1. Chanodug
2. Chenresig
3. Jambeyang

== See also ==
- Four Mountains
- Sacred mountains
- Grotto-heavens, Sacred grottoes, sometimes associated with sacred mountains
- Hills and mountains in Meitei culture
- Five Mountains of Korea

=== Other mountains with spiritual/religious significance in China ===
- Five Garrison Mountains (Five Zhen, 五镇)
  - Yiwulü Mountain
  - Mount Yi
  - Mount Wu
  - Mount Huo
  - Kuaiji
- Mount Lao
- Mount Mian
- Mount Sanqing
- Gongga

== Bibliography ==
- Robson, James (2009). Power of Place: The Religious Landscape of the Southern Sacred Peak (Nanyue) in Medieval China. Cambridge, Massachusetts: Harvard University Asia Center.
- Sun, Xiaochun; Kistemaker, Jacob (1997). The Chinese Sky During the Han: Constellating Stars and Society. Brill. ISBN 9004107371.
