= Hwaaksan =

Mountain in Gangwon Province, South Korea

- Broadcast transmitter station and Republic of Korea Air Forces radar site in Hwaaksan

Highest point
- Elevation: 1,468.3 m (4,817 ft)
- Prominence: 1,142 m (3,747 ft)
- Listing: Ribu
- Coordinates: 37°59′42″N 127°30′11″E

Geography
- Location: South Korea

Korean name
- Hangul: 화악산
- Hanja: 華岳山
- RR: Hwaaksan
- MR: Hwaaksan

Hwaaksan (Korean: 화악산) is a mountain in South Korea whose area extends over Gapyeong County, Gyeonggi Province and Hwacheon County, Gangwon Province. It has an elevation of 1,468.3 m (4,817 ft).

== See also ==
- List of mountains in Korea
