= Shijiazhai Township =

Shijiazhai Township 史家寨乡
- Township
- Shǐjiāzhài Xiāng
- Location in Hebei Location in China
- Coordinates: 38°55′29.9″N 114°16′25.1″E
- Country: People's Republic of China
- Province: Hebei
- Prefecture-level city: Baoding
- County: Fuping County

Area
  - Total: 256.2 km^{2} (98.9 sq mi)

Population (2010)
  - Total: 8,393
  - Density: 32.76/km^{2} (84.8/sq mi)
- Time zone: UTC+8 (China Standard)
- Area code: 312

Shijiazhai Township (Chinese: 史家寨乡; pinyin: Shǐjiāzhài Xiāng) is a rural township located in Fuping County, which is part of the prefecture-level city of Baoding in Hebei Province, China. As of the 2010 census, the township had a population of 8,393 residents living in an area of 256.2 square kilometers, resulting in a population density of approximately 32.76 inhabitants per square kilometer.

In terms of demographics from the 2010 census, the township had 4,329 males (48.4%) and 4,064 females (51.6%). Age distribution included 1,452 individuals aged 0–14 years (17.3%), 5,897 aged 15–64 years (70.3%), and 1,044 individuals aged 65 and above (12.4%).

== See also ==
- List of township-level divisions of Hebei
