= Beiyue Temple =

Former Taoist temple in Hebei, China

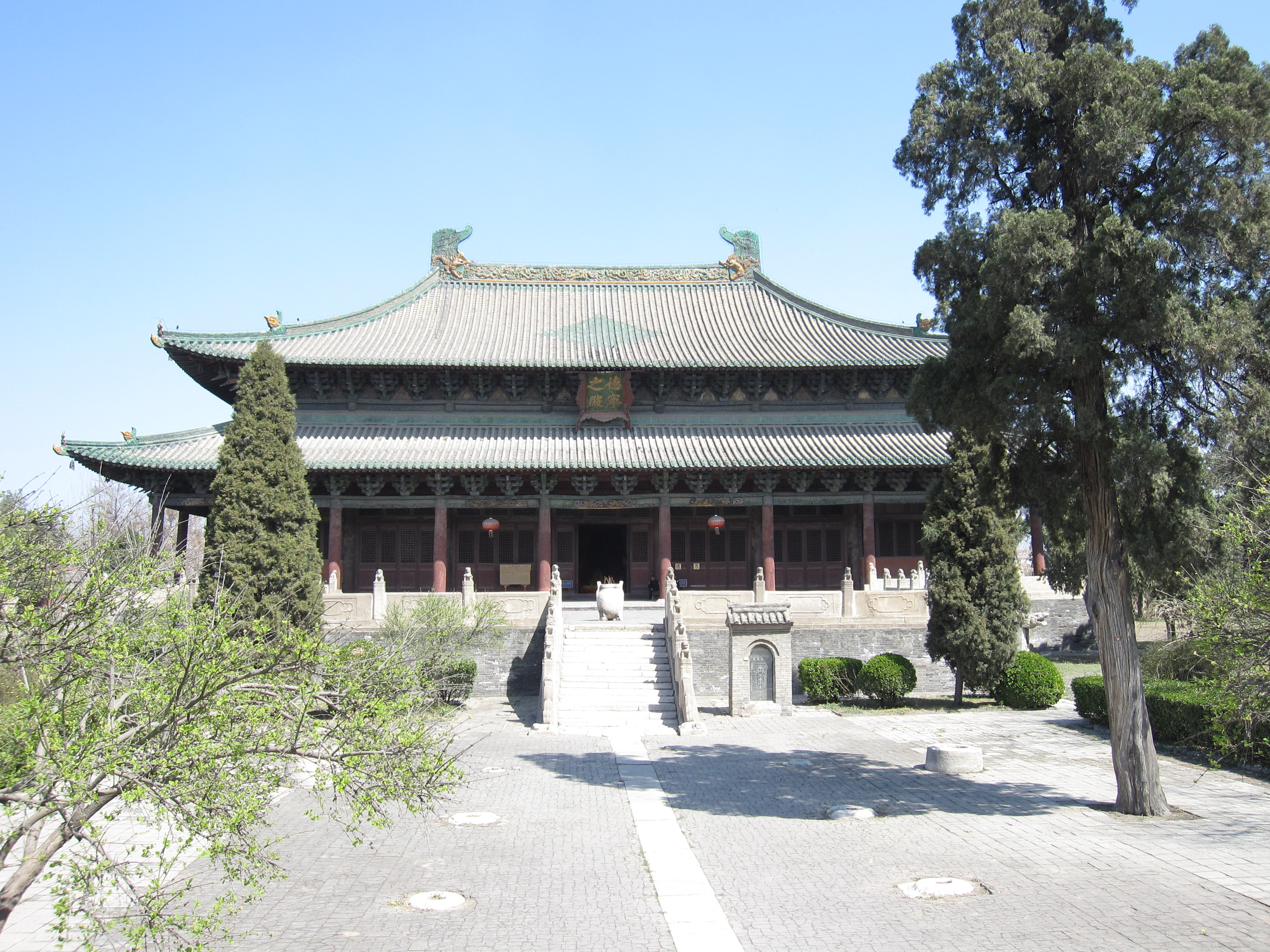
- The Dening Hall (Chinese: 德宁殿; pinyin: Déníng Diàn) of the Beiyue Temple

Religion
- Affiliation: Taoism
- Province: Hebei

Location
- Location: Quyang
- Interactive map of Beiyue Temple
- Coordinates: 38°37′19.20″N 114°41′28.14″E

Architecture
- Completed: 1270; Yuan dynasty

Beiyue Temple
- Traditional Chinese: 北嶽廟
- Simplified Chinese: 北岳庙
- Literal meaning: "Northern Peak Temple"
Transcriptions
Standard Mandarin
- Hanyu Pinyin: Běiyuè miào
- Wade–Giles: Pei^{3}-yüeh^{4} miao^{4}
- IPA: [pèɪ ɥê mjâʊ]
Yue: Cantonese
- Yale Romanization: Bāk-ngohk miuh
- Jyutping: Bak^{1}-ngok^{6} miu^{6}
Southern Min
- Tâi-lô: Pak-ga̍k biō

Beiyue Temple (Chinese: 北岳庙) is a Taoist temple located in Quyang, Hebei Province, China. The temple was used to make sacrifices to Mount Heng by the emperors of the Song dynasty while the mountain was occupied by the Liao dynasty. The Dening Hall of the temple is the largest, earliest and one of the most important extant wooden buildings built in the Yuan dynasty. The temple also contains three gates, an octagonal pavilion and many ancient stelae.

== History ==
The Beiyue Temple was first established either during the Northern Wei dynasty (386-584) or the Tang dynasty (618-907), but the site may have been in use as early as the 2nd century BCE of the Han dynasty. The temple has been rebuilt twice, first in 991 after having been destroyed by the Khitan during the 950s, and then in 1270. According to a surviving image of the temple dating from a local history of Quyang written in 1672, the temple had by this time achieved its present layout.

During the Song dynasty, Beiyue Temple was used as an alternate site to make sacrifices to the Northern Peak, Mount Heng, one of the sacred mountains of Daoism. During this time, Mount Heng was controlled by the Liao dynasty (916-1125). In order to maintain political legitimacy and receive Daoist support, Beiyue Temple was chosen by the Song Emperor as the location to make sacrifices to Hengshan. Even though the mountain was not controlled by the Song, they believed that a 'geomantic vein' that would direct their sacrifices could be cut through enemy-controlled territory and reach it.

== Architecture ==
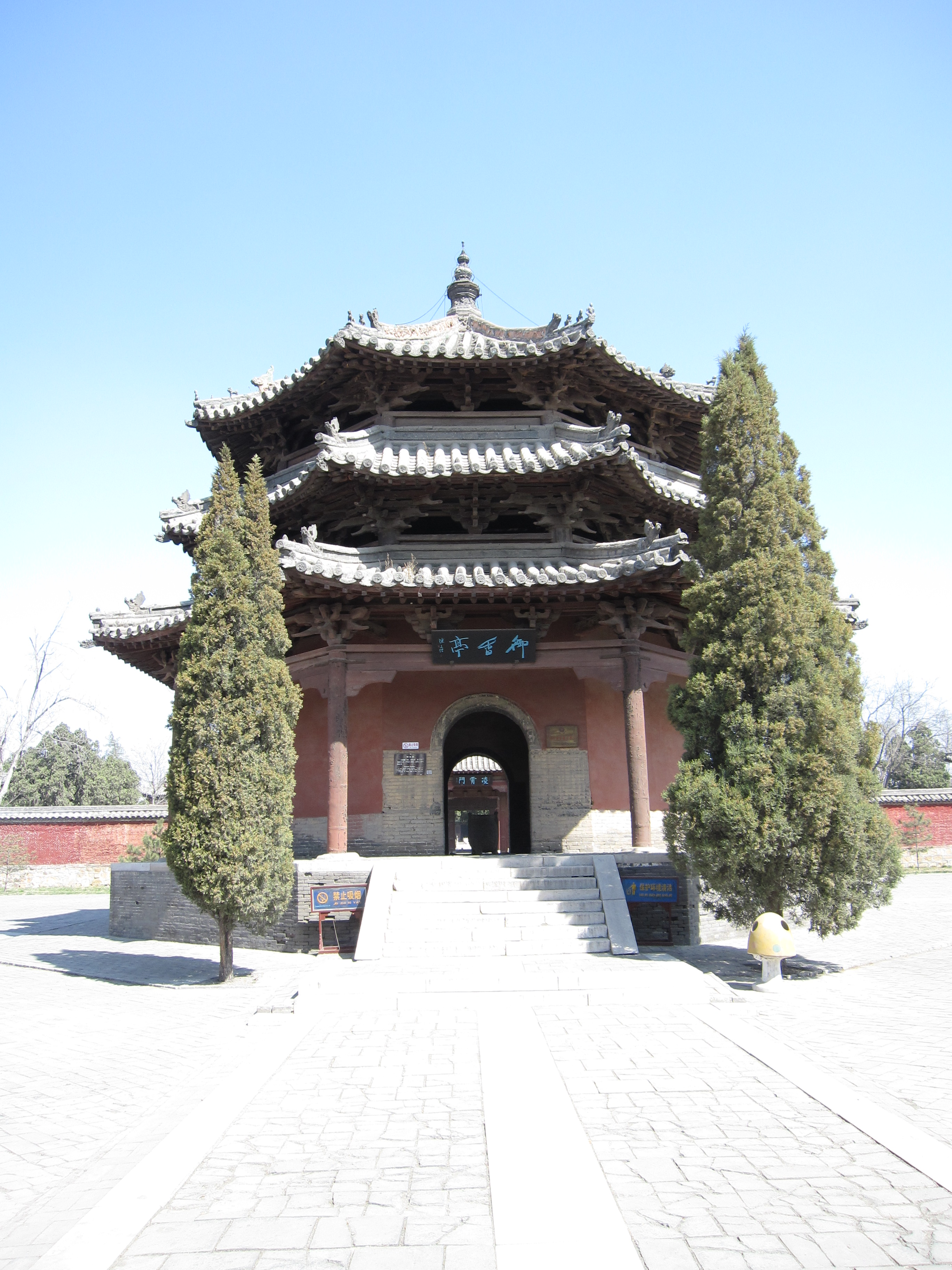
The Tianyi Pavilion

The Beiyue temple is laid out on a north–south axis featuring six extant buildings. From south to north, the buildings are: a gate, an octagonal building called the Tianyi Pavilion (天一阁) that was built during the Ming dynasty, two more gates, and the Dening Hall (德宁殿). A large platform in front of the Dening Hall now features the remains of stone sculptures, but was the site of another hall. According to signs at the temple, many of the buildings were rebuilt in the late 20th century.

The wall surrounding the temple was part of a city wall that surrounded Quyang. The south gate of the temple once served as one of the main gates for the town. Apart from the remnant that is part of the temple, nothing more survives of this wall. The temple grounds are also home to over 137 stelae, dating from the Northern Wei dynasty to the Qing dynasty.

=== Dening Hall ===
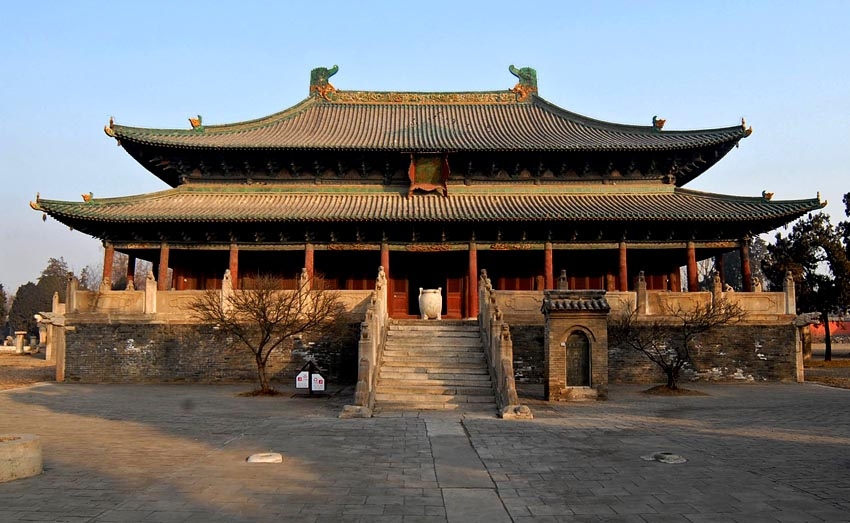

The Dening Hall is the main hall of the temple, and was built in 1270 during the Yuan dynasty. The hall is fronted by a massive platform known as a yuetai (月台, literally moon platform), which measures 25 by 20 meters. Built on a very high platform itself, the Dening Hall can be accessed by either a center front staircases or one of two side staircases attached to the yuetai. Enclosing the perimeter of the platform is a white marble balustrade capped by lions. The hall itself measures seven by four bays and is surrounded by a covered arcade. According to the Yingzao Fashi, a Song dynasty architectural treatise, the Dening Hall has 6th puzuo type column bracketing to support its roof. This type of bracketing has three transverse and three horizontal bracket arms. The 6th puzuo brackets are the most complex that survive from the Yuan dynasty. Based on the complex bracketing, the marble balustrade and the height of the platform, Steinhardt identifies the Dening Hall as one of the two most eminent and important extant wooden halls that date from the Yuan period. These characteristics also closely match descriptions of the architecture at the capital, meaning that Dening Hall is representative of the architecture at the Yuan dynasty capital of Dadu (currently Beijing).

The Dening Hall has Taoist murals painted on three of its walls. The western wall's mural, said to have been painted in the Tang dynasty, measures 17 by 7 meters and features a local water deity with a winged being at the top. With similar dimensions to the western mural, the eastern mural portrays the Dragon King. The hall contains nine statues, all dating from a more recent period than the hall.
