= Beiluo =

Beiluo 北罗镇
- Town
- Běiluó Zhèn
- Location in Hebei Location in China
- Coordinates: 38°42′28″N 114°51′40″E
- Country: People's Republic of China
- Province: Hebei
- Prefecture-level city: Baoding
- County: Tang

Area
  - Total: 39.08 km^{2} (15.09 sq mi)

Population (2010)
  - Total: 50,949
- Time zone: UTC+8 (China Standard)

Beiluo (Chinese: 北罗镇; pinyin: Běiluó Zhèn) is a town located in Tang County, Baoding, Hebei, China. According to the 2010 census, Beiluo had a population of 50,949, including 24,941 males and 26,008 females. The population was distributed as follows: 10,999 people aged under 14, 36,455 people aged between 15 and 64, and 3,495 people aged over 65.

== See also ==
- List of township-level divisions of Hebei
