= Fuping County, Hebei =

Fuping County 阜平县
- County
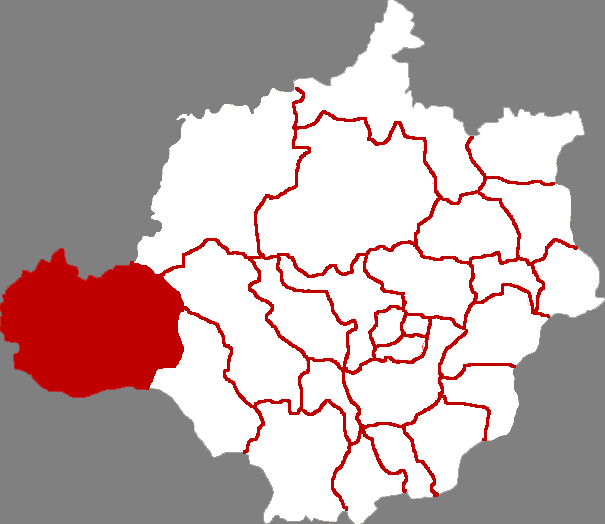
- Fuping in Baoding

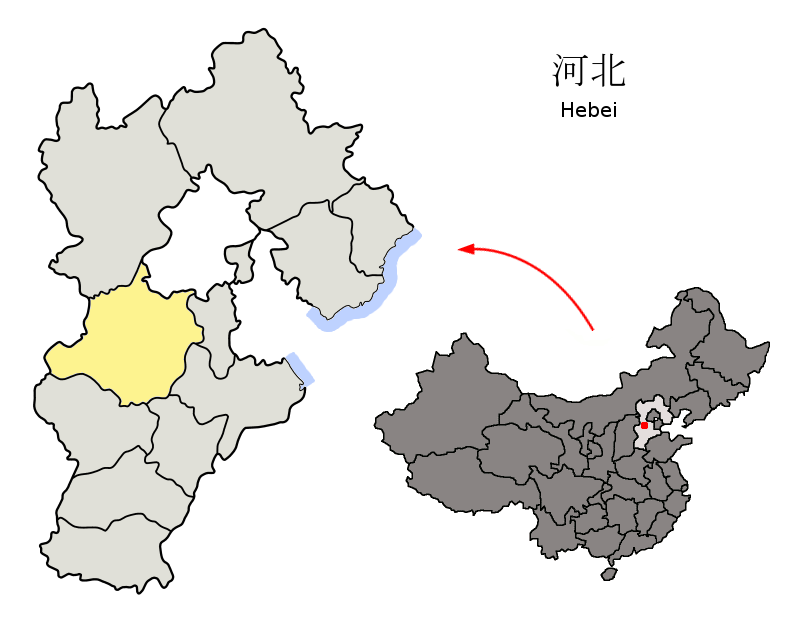
- Baoding in Hebei
- Coordinates: 38°50′56″N 114°11′42″E
- Country: People's Republic of China
- Province: Hebei
- Prefecture-level city: Baoding
- County seat: Fuping Town (阜平镇)

Area
  - Total: 2,497 km^{2} (964 sq mi)
- Elevation: 262 m (860 ft)

Population (2020 census)
  - Total: 194,004
  - Density: 77.69/km^{2} (201.2/sq mi)
- Time zone: UTC+8 (China Standard)
- Postal code: 073200
- Website: www.bdfuping.gov.cn

Fuping (Chinese: 阜平; pinyin: Fùpíng) is a county of west-central Hebei province, China, bordering Wutai County, Shanxi to the west. It is the westernmost county-level division of the prefecture-level city of Baoding, and is 93 km (58 mi) north-northwest of Shijiazhuang, the provincial capital. As of 2021, it had a population of 190,540 residing in an area of 2,497 km^{2} (964 sq mi).

== History ==
Fuping County was a guerilla warfare front during the Second Sino-Japanese War and a revolutionary base during the successive Chinese Civil War.

During December 29 and 30, 2012 there was a nationally televised visit by General Secretary of the Chinese Communist Party Xi Jinping to the villages of Luotuowan and Gujiatai in Longquanguan township which illustrated rural poverty in China. The residents, corn farmers, have an average per capita annual income of $160. Average income for the county as a whole is 2,400 yuan ($390). Following the telecast there was a generous outpouring of aid by the Chinese public to the village. The government has pledged $40 million to Luotuowan and other villages in Fuping County.

== Administrative divisions ==
There are 5 towns and 8 townships under the county's administration.

Towns:

- Fuping (阜平镇), Longquanguan (龙泉关镇), Pingyang (平阳镇), Chengnanzhuang (城南庄镇), Tianshengqiao (天生桥镇)

Townships:

- Wanglinkou Township (王林口乡), Taiyu Township (台峪乡), Datai Township (大台乡), Shijiazhai Township (史家寨乡), Shawo Township (砂窝乡), Wuwangkou Township (吴王口乡), Xiazhuang Township (下庄乡), Beiguoyuan Township (北果元乡)

== Climate ==
Climate data for Fuping, elevation 282 m (925 ft), (1991–2020 normals, extremes 1981–present)
Month	Jan	Feb	Mar	Apr	May	Jun	Jul	Aug	Sep	Oct	Nov	Dec	Year
Record high °C (°F)	17.1 (62.8)	22.5 (72.5)	31.2 (88.2)	36.3 (97.3)	39.1 (102.4)	41.7 (107.1)	41.2 (106.2)	39.9 (103.8)	35.6 (96.1)	31.7 (89.1)	26.0 (78.8)	22.0 (71.6)	41.7 (107.1)
Mean daily maximum °C (°F)	3.6 (38.5)	7.2 (45.0)	14.1 (57.4)	21.8 (71.2)	27.6 (81.7)	30.9 (87.6)	31.2 (88.2)	30.0 (86.0)	26.1 (79.0)	20.1 (68.2)	11.7 (53.1)	5.2 (41.4)	19.1 (66.4)
Daily mean °C (°F)	−3.2 (26.2)	0.4 (32.7)	7.4 (45.3)	15.2 (59.4)	21.1 (70.0)	24.9 (76.8)	26.2 (79.2)	24.8 (76.6)	20.0 (68.0)	13.3 (55.9)	4.9 (40.8)	−1.5 (29.3)	12.8 (55.0)
Mean daily minimum °C (°F)	−8.1 (17.4)	−4.7 (23.5)	1.6 (34.9)	8.7 (47.7)	14.4 (57.9)	19.1 (66.4)	21.8 (71.2)	20.6 (69.1)	15.2 (59.4)	7.9 (46.2)	−0.1 (31.8)	−6.2 (20.8)	7.5 (45.5)
Record low °C (°F)	−19.0 (−2.2)	−15.3 (4.5)	−9.6 (14.7)	−1.7 (28.9)	4.3 (39.7)	9.5 (49.1)	15.2 (59.4)	11.5 (52.7)	2.3 (36.1)	−4.1 (24.6)	−9.7 (14.5)	−15.6 (3.9)	−19.0 (−2.2)
Average precipitation mm (inches)	2.6 (0.10)	4.4 (0.17)	9.5 (0.37)	20.5 (0.81)	38.2 (1.50)	76.4 (3.01)	167.5 (6.59)	143.8 (5.66)	66.4 (2.61)	24.7 (0.97)	14.0 (0.55)	2.4 (0.09)	570.4 (22.43)
Average precipitation days (≥ 0.1 mm)	1.7	2.6	3.1	4.8	6.7	10.6	13.6	12.5	8.6	5.5	3.7	1.6	75
Average snowy days	2.4	2.7	1.4	0.2	0	0	0	0	0	0	1.9	2.1	10.7
Average relative humidity (%)	46	44	40	43	49	57	72	75	69	60	55	49	55
Mean monthly sunshine hours	188.2	184.0	224.6	236.0	264.7	222.9	187.0	196.6	199.9	203.8	185.0	184.9	2,477.6
Percentage possible sunshine	62	60	60	59	60	50	42	47	54	60	62	63	57
Source: China Meteorological AdministrationAll-time June low

== Economy ==
Open pit gold, copper and iron mines operate in Fuping.

== Transportation ==
- China National Highway 207
- G1812 Cangzhou–Yulin Expressway

== See also ==
- Wangkuai Reservoir, partially located in Fuping
