= List of mountains in Korea =

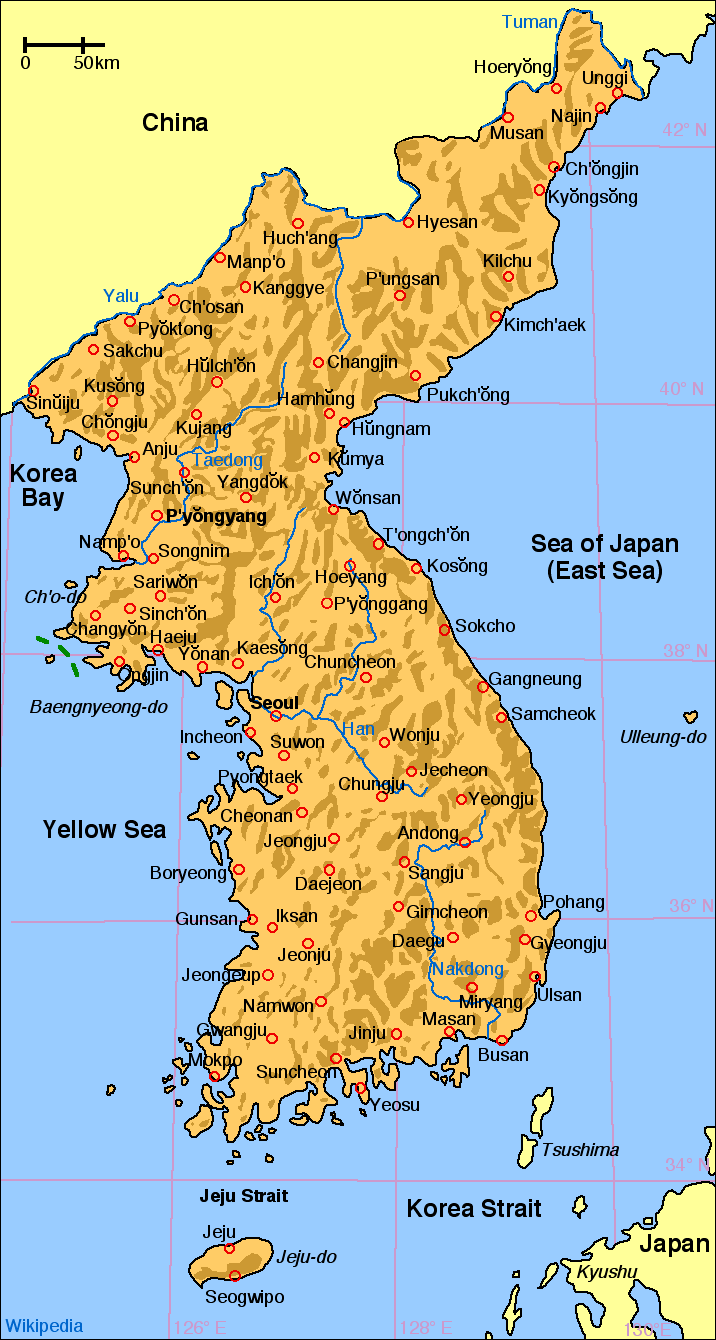
Map of Korea

The following is a list of mountains in Korea:

== See also ==
- Geography of Korea, North Korea, and South Korea
- List of mountains in Seoul
- List of rivers of Korea
- List of waterfalls in South Korea
- Baekdudaegan
- Five Mountains of Korea, five famous mountains in Korean history and culture
- Korean Peninsula
