= Shawo, Xin County =

Shawo 沙窝镇
- Town
- Location in Henan
- Coordinates: 31°41′26″N 115°07′36″E
- Country: People's Republic of China
- Province: Henan
- Prefecture-level city: Xinyang
- County: Xin
- Elevation: 121 m (397 ft)
- Time zone: UTC+8 (China Standard)
- Area code: 0376

Shawo (simplified Chinese: 沙窝; traditional Chinese: 沙窩; pinyin: Shāwō) is a town of Xin County in extreme southeastern Henan province, China, situated in the Dabie Mountains 24 kilometres (15 mi) east-northeast (as the crow flies) of the county seat and more than 105 km (65 mi) southeast of downtown Xinyang, and served by China National Highway 106. As of 2011, it has one residential community (社区) and 13 villages under its administration.

== See also ==
- List of township-level divisions of Henan
