= Dangcheng Township =

Dangcheng Township 党城乡
- Rural Township
- Dăngchéng Xiāng
- Location in Hebei Location in China
- Coordinates: 38°44′16″N 114°34′33″E
- Country: People's Republic of China
- Province: Hebei
- Prefecture-level city: Baoding
- County: Quyang

Area
  - Total: 60.38 km^{2} (23.31 sq mi)

Population (2010)
  - Total: 23,237
  - Density: 384.8/km^{2} (997/sq mi)
- Time zone: UTC+8 (China Standard)

Dangcheng Township (Chinese: 党城乡; pinyin: Dăngchéng Xiāng) is a rural township located in Quyang County, Baoding, Hebei, China. According to the 2010 census, Dangcheng Township had a population of 23,237, including 12,040 males and 11,197 females. The population was distributed as follows: 5,842 people aged under 14, 15,994 people aged between 15 and 64, and 1,401 people aged over 65.

== See also ==
- List of township-level divisions of Hebei
