= Chengnanzhuang =

Chengnanzhuang 城南庄镇
- Town
- Chéngnánzhuāng Zhèn
- Location in Hebei Location in China
- Coordinates: 38°44′15.2″N 114°10′07.3″E
- Country: People's Republic of China
- Province: Hebei
- Prefecture-level city: Baoding
- County: Fuping County

Area
  - Total: 273.6 km^{2} (105.6 sq mi)

Population (2010)
  - Total: 20,812
  - Density: 76.1/km^{2} (197/sq mi)
- Time zone: UTC+8 (China Standard)
- Area code: 312

Chengnanzhuang (Chinese: 城南庄镇; pinyin: Chéngnánzhuāng Zhèn) is a town in Fuping County, under the jurisdiction of the prefecture-level city of Baoding, in Hebei Province, China. According to the 2010 Chinese census, it had a population of 20,812 living in a total area of 273.6 square kilometers, resulting in a population density of approximately 76.1 inhabitants per square kilometer.

In 2010, the gender distribution included 10,692 males (48.6%) and 10,120 females (51.4%). The population age structure was as follows: 19.9% (4,149) aged 0–14 years, 69.5% (14,462) aged 15–64, and 10.6% (2,201) aged 65 and over.

== See also ==
- List of township-level divisions of Hebei
