= Shawo Township, Hebei =

Shawo Township 砂窝乡
- Township
- Shāwō Xiāng
- Location in Hebei Location in China
- Coordinates: 38°59′53.4″N 114°03′00.9″E
- Country: People's Republic of China
- Province: Hebei
- Prefecture-level city: Baoding
- County: Fuping County

Area
  - Total: 242.8 km^{2} (93.7 sq mi)

Population (2010)
  - Total: 10,323
  - Density: 42.52/km^{2} (110.1/sq mi)
- Time zone: UTC+8 (China Standard)
- Area code: 312

Shawo Township (Chinese: 砂窝乡; pinyin: Shāwō Xiāng) is a rural township located in Fuping County, which is part of the prefecture-level city of Baoding in Hebei Province, China. As of the 2010 census, the township had a population of 10,323 residents over an area of 242.8 square kilometers, with a population density of approximately 42.52 people per square kilometer.

According to the 2010 census data, the population included 5,263 males (49%) and 5,060 females (51%). The age distribution was as follows: 2,098 individuals (20.3%) were aged 0–14, 6,983 (67.6%) were aged 15–64, and 1,242 (12%) were aged 65 and above.

== See also ==
- List of township-level divisions of Hebei
