= Baoshui Township =

Baoshui Township 雹水乡
- Rural Township
- Báoshuĭ Xiāng
- Location in Hebei Location in China
- Coordinates: 38°43′20″N 114°49′47″E
- Country: People's Republic of China
- Province: Hebei
- Prefecture-level city: Baoding
- County-level city: Tang

Area
  - Total: 33.71 km^{2} (13.02 sq mi)

Population (2010)
  - Total: 15,722
  - Density: 466.4/km^{2} (1,208/sq mi)
- Time zone: UTC+8 (China Standard)

Baoshui Township (Chinese: 雹水乡; pinyin: Báoshuĭ Xiāng) is a rural township located in Tang County, Baoding, Hebei, China. According to the 2010 census, Baoshui Township had a population of 15,722, including 7,311 males and 8,411 females. The population was distributed as follows: 3,554 people aged under 14, 10,903 people aged between 15 and 64, and 1,265 people aged over 65.

== See also ==
- List of township-level divisions of Hebei
