= Tang County =

Tang County 唐县
- County
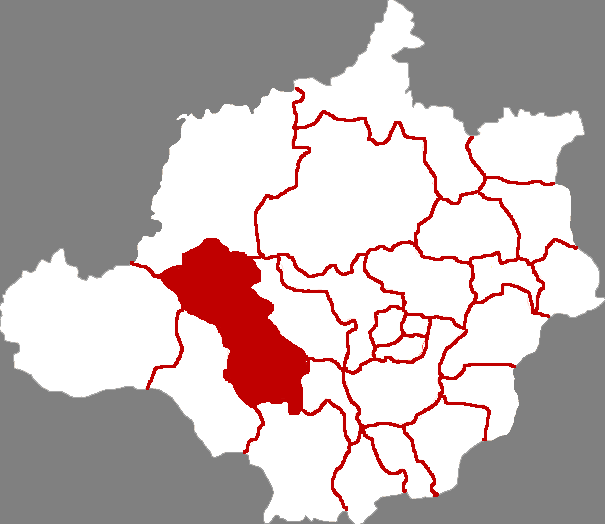
- Tang County in Baoding

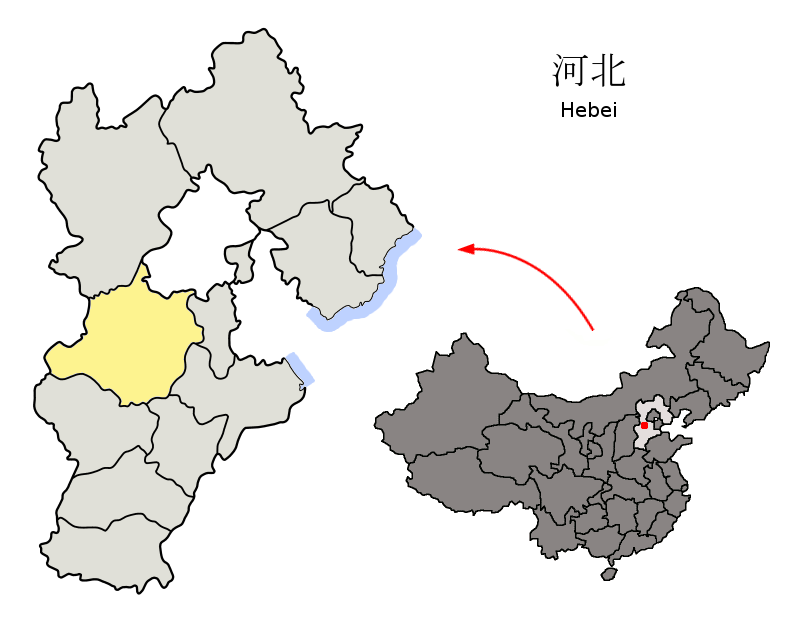
- Baoding in Hebei
- Coordinates: 38°44′53″N 114°58′59″E
- Country: People's Republic of China
- Province: Hebei
- Prefecture-level city: Baoding

Population (2020 census)
  - Total: 505,849
- Time zone: UTC+8 (China Standard)
- Website: www.tangxian.gov.cn

Tang County or Tangxian (simplified Chinese: 唐县; traditional Chinese: 唐縣; pinyin: Táng xiàn) is a county under the jurisdiction of Baoding prefecture-level city, in west-central Hebei province, People's Republic of China.

== Administrative divisions ==
Towns:

- Renhou (仁厚镇), Wangjing (王京镇), Gaochang (高昌镇), Beiluo (北罗镇), Baihe (白合镇), Juncheng (军城镇), Chuanli (川里镇)

Townships:

- Changgucheng Township (长古城乡), Duting Township (都亭乡), Nandiantou Township (南店头乡), Beidiantou Township (北店头乡), Luozhuang Township (罗庄乡), Baoshui Township (雹水乡), Dayang Township (大洋乡), Micheng Township (迷城乡), Qijiazhuang Township (齐家佐乡), Yangjiao Township (羊角乡), Shimen Township (石门乡), Huangshikou Township (黄石口乡), Daomaguan Township (倒马关乡)

== Climate ==
Climate data for Tangxian, elevation 67 m (220 ft), (1991–2020 normals, extremes 1981–2010)
Month	Jan	Feb	Mar	Apr	May	Jun	Jul	Aug	Sep	Oct	Nov	Dec	Year
Record high °C (°F)	17.9 (64.2)	23.1 (73.6)	31.3 (88.3)	33.3 (91.9)	37.8 (100.0)	41.5 (106.7)	42.0 (107.6)	36.1 (97.0)	35.0 (95.0)	31.8 (89.2)	25.1 (77.2)	20.3 (68.5)	42.0 (107.6)
Mean daily maximum °C (°F)	3.3 (37.9)	7.4 (45.3)	14.4 (57.9)	21.7 (71.1)	27.4 (81.3)	31.6 (88.9)	32.1 (89.8)	30.5 (86.9)	26.8 (80.2)	20.2 (68.4)	11.3 (52.3)	4.8 (40.6)	19.3 (66.7)
Daily mean °C (°F)	−2.9 (26.8)	0.9 (33.6)	7.9 (46.2)	15.2 (59.4)	21.2 (70.2)	25.6 (78.1)	27.1 (80.8)	25.6 (78.1)	20.7 (69.3)	13.8 (56.8)	5.3 (41.5)	−0.9 (30.4)	13.3 (55.9)
Mean daily minimum °C (°F)	−7.3 (18.9)	−3.9 (25.0)	2.3 (36.1)	9.2 (48.6)	15.1 (59.2)	20.1 (68.2)	22.9 (73.2)	21.7 (71.1)	16.1 (61.0)	8.9 (48.0)	0.9 (33.6)	−4.9 (23.2)	8.4 (47.2)
Record low °C (°F)	−18.4 (−1.1)	−16.9 (1.6)	−8.7 (16.3)	−3.6 (25.5)	2.4 (36.3)	10.2 (50.4)	16.0 (60.8)	13.2 (55.8)	5.4 (41.7)	−4.0 (24.8)	−14.4 (6.1)	−21.5 (−6.7)	−21.5 (−6.7)
Average precipitation mm (inches)	2.5 (0.10)	5.0 (0.20)	8.9 (0.35)	24.8 (0.98)	33.7 (1.33)	64.0 (2.52)	162.9 (6.41)	127.2 (5.01)	56.2 (2.21)	22.1 (0.87)	11.8 (0.46)	2.4 (0.09)	521.5 (20.53)
Average precipitation days (≥ 0.1 mm)	1.6	2.4	2.8	5.3	6.5	9.3	12.7	11.3	7.6	5.4	3.5	2.0	70.4
Average snowy days	2.6	2.6	1.3	0.2	0	0	0	0	0	0	1.7	2.7	11.1
Average relative humidity (%)	55	51	47	53	58	61	75	80	75	69	65	58	62
Mean monthly sunshine hours	147.4	153.3	213.2	231.7	252.8	212.5	178.7	188.3	184.5	178.6	157.8	152.2	2,251
Percentage possible sunshine	48	50	57	58	57	48	40	45	50	52	53	52	51
Source: China Meteorological Administration
