= Quyang County =

County in Hebei, China

Quyang County 曲阳县 Kuyang
- County
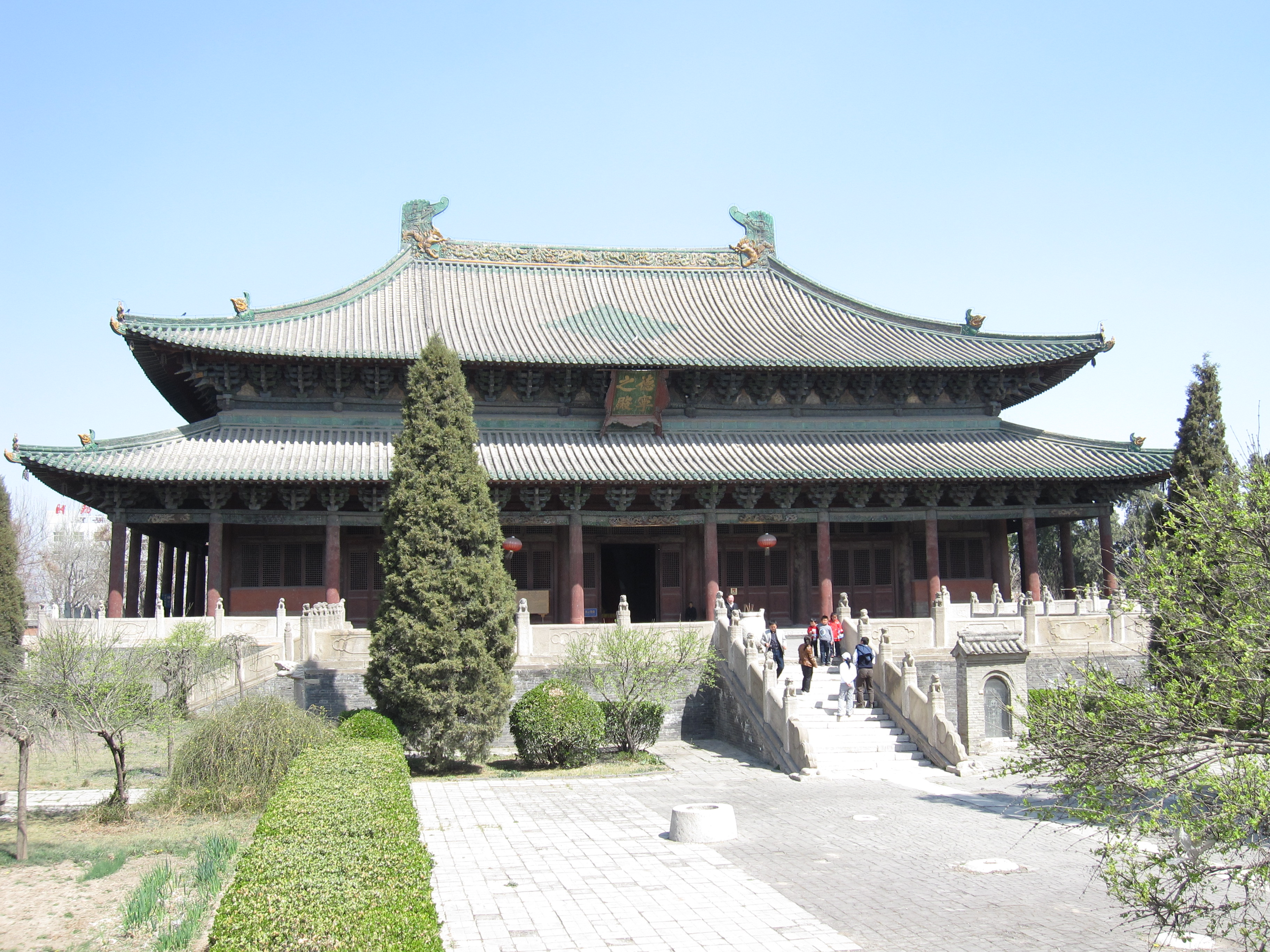
- Beiyue Temple in Quyang

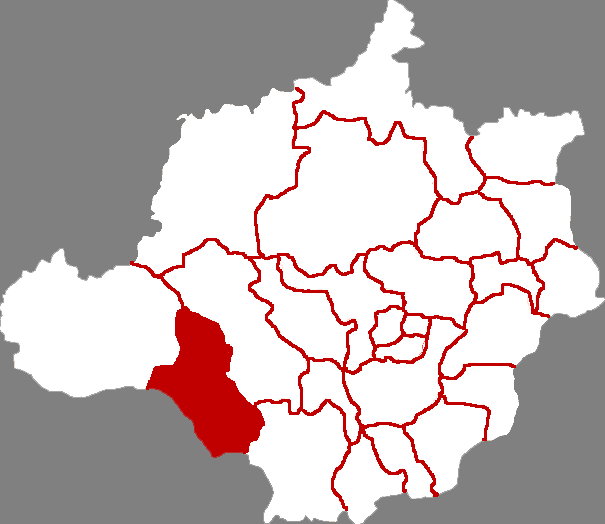
- Location in Baoding

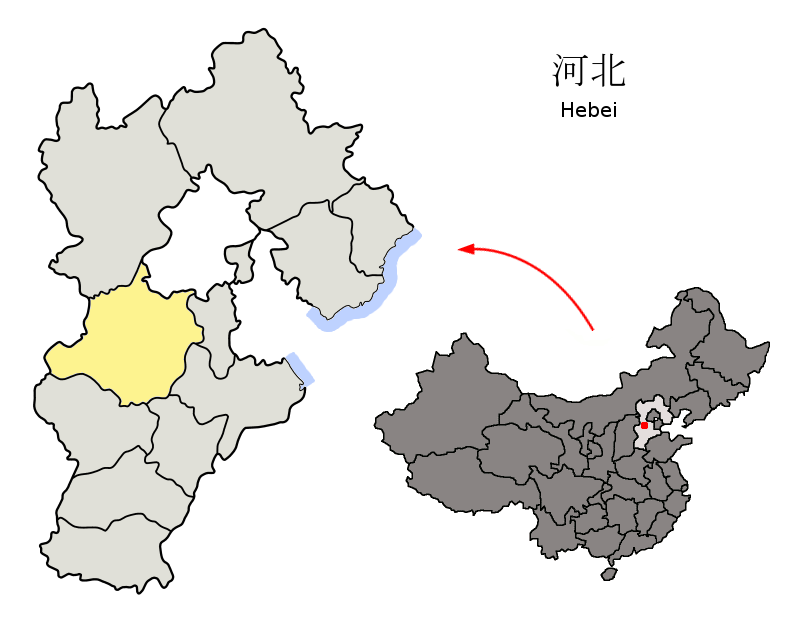
- Baoding in Hebei
- Coordinates: 38°37′20″N 114°44′42″E
- Country: People's Republic of China
- Province: Hebei
- Prefecture-level city: Baoding
- County seat: Hengzhou Town

Area
  - Total: 1,083.7 km^{2} (418.4 sq mi)

Population (2020 census)
  - Total: 573,975
  - Density: 529.64/km^{2} (1,371.8/sq mi)
- Time zone: UTC+8 (China Standard)
- Postal code: 073100

Quyang County
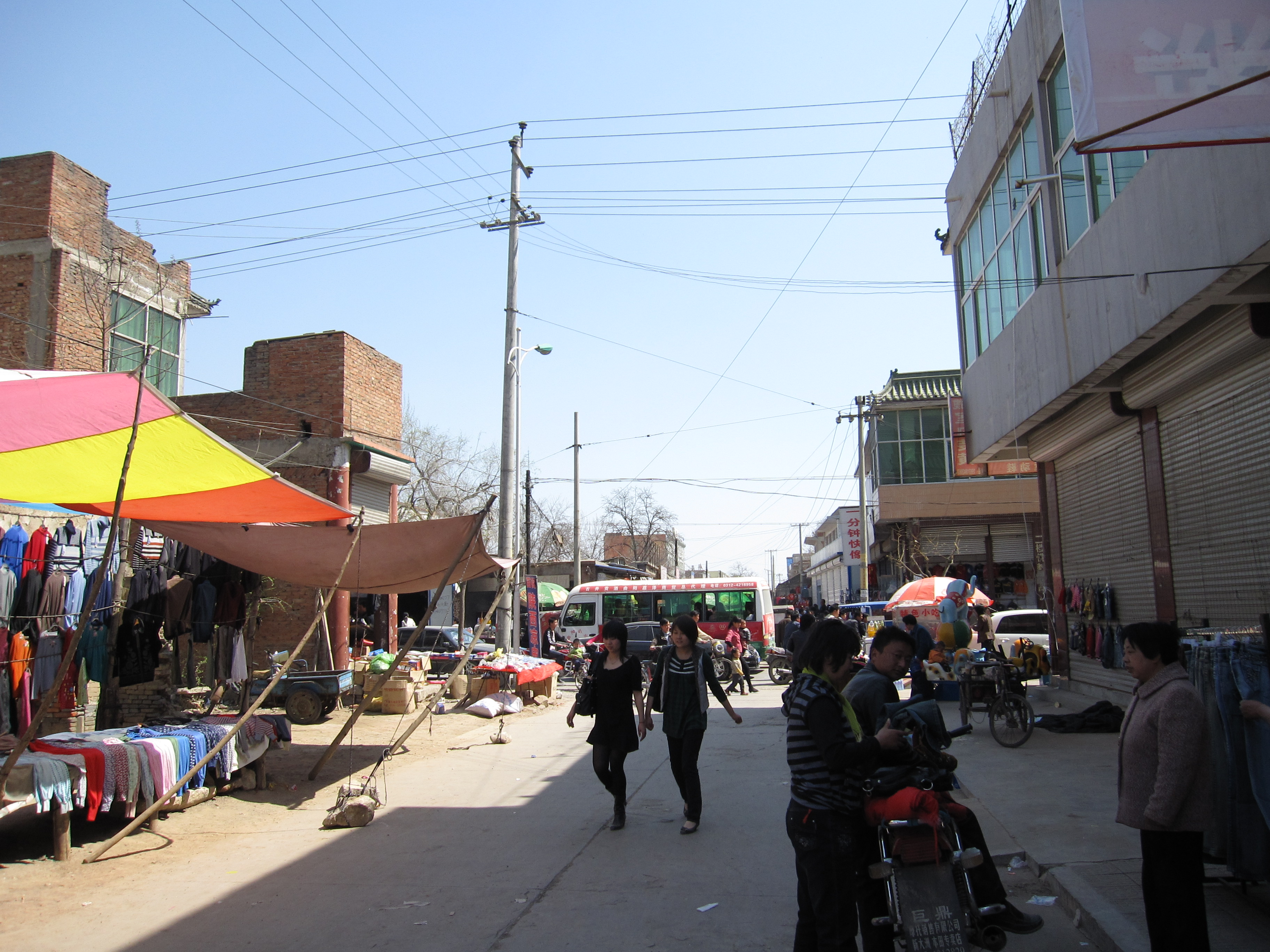
- A street in Quyang
- Traditional Chinese: 曲陽縣
- Simplified Chinese: 曲阳县
- Postal: Kuyang
Transcriptions
Standard Mandarin
- Hanyu Pinyin: Qūyáng Xiàn
- Wade–Giles: Ch'ü-yang Hsien

Hengzhou
- Traditional Chinese: 恆州
- Simplified Chinese: 恒州
- Literal meaning: [Seat of] Heng Prefecture
Transcriptions
Standard Mandarin
- Hanyu Pinyin: Héngzhōu
- Wade–Giles: Hêng-chou

Quyang County is a county under the administration of Baoding, Hebei Province, China. The county is famous for its stone carvings, many of which are exported abroad. The Beiyue Temple is located in Quyang city.

== History ==
During the late Tang and early Five Dynasties and Ten Kingdoms Era, Quyang made up part of the largely independent domain of the Yiwu jiedushi. The tomb of Wang Chuzhi—whose funerary art illustrates the elite music of the time—was rediscovered in Lingshan's Xiyanchuan Village in 1980, looted in 1994, and excavated in 1995. Under the Yuan, its seat also served as the center of Heng Prefecture, originally based in Zhengding County north of central Shijiazhuang, and was similarly known as Hengzhou. The name is maintained by one of the county's towns.

== Administrative divisions ==
Towns:

- Hengzhou (恒州镇), Lingshan (灵山镇), Yanzhao (燕赵镇), Yangping (羊平镇)

Townships:

- Luzhuangzi Township (路庄子乡), Xiahe Township (下河乡), Zhuangke Township (庄窠乡), Xiaomu Township (孝墓乡), Wende Township (文德乡), Dongwang Township (东旺乡), Xiaolin Township (晓林乡), Dicun Township (邸村乡), Chande Township (产德乡), Qicun Township (齐村乡), Dangcheng Township (党城乡), Langjiazhuang Township (郎家庄乡), Fanjiazhuang Township (范家庄乡), Beitai Township (北台乡)

== Climate ==
Climate data for Quyang, elevation 104 m (341 ft), (1991–2020 normals, extremes 1981–2010)
Month	Jan	Feb	Mar	Apr	May	Jun	Jul	Aug	Sep	Oct	Nov	Dec	Year
Record high °C (°F)	16.4 (61.5)	23.2 (73.8)	30.2 (86.4)	34.1 (93.4)	38.1 (100.6)	41.5 (106.7)	41.6 (106.9)	36.2 (97.2)	34.7 (94.5)	32.5 (90.5)	24.8 (76.6)	22.0 (71.6)	41.6 (106.9)
Mean daily maximum °C (°F)	3.1 (37.6)	7.1 (44.8)	14.3 (57.7)	21.5 (70.7)	27.2 (81.0)	31.3 (88.3)	31.5 (88.7)	29.9 (85.8)	26.2 (79.2)	20.0 (68.0)	11.3 (52.3)	4.7 (40.5)	19.0 (66.2)
Daily mean °C (°F)	−4.1 (24.6)	−0.1 (31.8)	7.2 (45.0)	14.6 (58.3)	20.3 (68.5)	24.7 (76.5)	26.3 (79.3)	24.6 (76.3)	19.4 (66.9)	12.2 (54.0)	4.1 (39.4)	−2.1 (28.2)	12.3 (54.1)
Mean daily minimum °C (°F)	−9.5 (14.9)	−5.6 (21.9)	0.5 (32.9)	7.2 (45.0)	12.7 (54.9)	18.0 (64.4)	21.6 (70.9)	20.2 (68.4)	14.0 (57.2)	6.2 (43.2)	−1.3 (29.7)	−7.0 (19.4)	6.4 (43.6)
Record low °C (°F)	−19.6 (−3.3)	−16.4 (2.5)	−9.3 (15.3)	−3.2 (26.2)	1.9 (35.4)	8.0 (46.4)	14.7 (58.5)	11.5 (52.7)	1.6 (34.9)	−5.0 (23.0)	−14.4 (6.1)	−19.2 (−2.6)	−19.6 (−3.3)
Average precipitation mm (inches)	2.1 (0.08)	4.3 (0.17)	8.7 (0.34)	23.4 (0.92)	36.5 (1.44)	62.3 (2.45)	140.4 (5.53)	122.7 (4.83)	57.8 (2.28)	21.8 (0.86)	11.4 (0.45)	2.1 (0.08)	493.5 (19.43)
Average precipitation days (≥ 0.1 mm)	1.5	2.1	2.6	5.3	6.0	9.0	12.5	11.4	7.5	5.2	3.3	1.5	67.9
Average snowy days	2.6	2.2	1.4	0.2	0	0	0	0	0	0	1.6	2.6	10.6
Average relative humidity (%)	58	53	49	55	61	65	79	84	82	76	68	62	66
Mean monthly sunshine hours	145.1	151.1	201.1	225.8	254.3	212.5	171.8	179.6	186.4	184.1	154.9	146.5	2,213.2
Percentage possible sunshine	48	49	54	57	57	48	38	43	51	54	52	50	50
Source: China Meteorological Administration
