= Peter Chen Bolu =

Chinese Catholic bishop (1913–2009)

- Bishop of the Roman Catholic Diocese of Yongnian
- Province: Roman Catholic Archdiocese of Beijing
- Diocese: Roman Catholic Diocese of Yongnian
- Installed: May 19, 1987
- Term ended: 1999
- Predecessor: Joseph Cui Shouxun
- Successor: John Han Dingxiang

Orders
- Ordination: 1944 by Joseph Cui Shouxun

Personal details
- Born: 23 May 1914 Guangping County, Hebei
- Died: November 5, 2009 (aged 95) Wei County, Handan, Hebei
- Denomination: Roman Catholic
- Coat of arms

Peter Chen Bolu
- Simplified Chinese: 陈柏庐
- Traditional Chinese: 陳柏廬
Transcriptions
Standard Mandarin
- Hanyu Pinyin: Chén Bólú

Peter Chen Bolu (23 May 1914 – November 5, 2009) was the Chinese bishop of the Roman Catholic Diocese of Daming.

== Biography ==
Chen was born in 1914. He was first ordained as a Roman Catholic priest in 1944. He was imprisoned and sent to a hard labor camp during the Cultural Revolution.

Chen was secretly ordained the bishop of the Roman Catholic Diocese of Hongdong by Bishop Francis Han Tingbi in 1986.

He was openly installed and ordained as the Chinese bishop of the Roman Catholic Diocese of Handan on May 29, 1988. Unlike other bishops, Chen's appointment was supported both by the Vatican and the government of the People's Republic of China. As bishop, Chen oversaw the construction of the Dazhong Hospital within the diocese, which opened in 1994. He also built ten health care clinics throughout the diocese, which is located in northern China.

He remained at that post until his retirement in 1999.

Chen died on November 5, 2009, at the Dazhong Hospital (大众医院), which he built, at the age of 96. At the time of his death, Chen was the oldest Catholic bishop in China. His funeral was held on November 11, 2009, in church in the village of Qiancaozhuang, Yongnian District, Handan.

Catholic Church titles
Previous: Joseph Cui Shouxun	Bishop of the Roman Catholic Diocese of Yongnian; 1987–1999	Next: John Han Dingxiang
