= Joseph Sun =

Joseph Sun may refer to:

- Joseph Sun Yuanmo (1920–2006), Chinese Roman Catholic bishop
- Joseph Sun Jigen (born 1967), Chinese Roman Catholic bishop

== See also ==
- Joe Sun (1943–2019), American country music singer
- Joseph Sung (born 1959), Hong Kong gastroenterologist
- Joseph Son (disambiguation)
