= Joseph Hou =

Joseph Hou may refer to:

- Joseph Hou Jinde (1918–1994), Chinese Roman Catholic bishop
- Joseph Hou Guoyang (1922–?), Chinese Roman Catholic bishop
