= Francis Han Tingbi =

Chinese Catholic bishop

- Bishop of the Roman Catholic Diocese of Hongdong
- Church: Cathedral of Hongtong
- Archdiocese: Roman Catholic Archdiocese of Taiyuan
- Diocese: Roman Catholic Diocese of Hongdong
- Installed: April 18, 1950
- Term ended: December 21, 1991
- Predecessor: Joseph Gao Zonghan
- Successor: Joseph Sun Yuanmo

Orders
- Ordination: July 22, 1934
- Consecration: July 9, 1950 by Antonio Riberi

Personal details
- Born: February 22, 1908 Qing Empire
- Died: December 21, 1991 (aged 83) People's Republic of China
- Denomination: Roman Catholic

Francis Han Tingbi (simplified Chinese: 韩廷弼; traditional Chinese: 韓廷弼; pinyin: Hán Tíngbì; February 22, 1908 – December 21, 1991) was a Chinese Catholic priest and Bishop of the Roman Catholic Diocese of Hongdong between 1950 and 1991.

== Biography ==
Han came from a Catholic family who had moved from Shandong to Shanxi after and because of the Taiping Rebellion. He was ordained a priest on July 22, 1934.

On April 18, 1950, he was appointed Bishop of the Roman Catholic Diocese of Hongdong by Pope Pius XII. On July 9, his consecration ceremony was held. In 1958, during the rule of Mao Zedong, Hongdong was selected as one of the two pilot counties for the elimination of religion in China (the other is Pingyang, Zhejiang). The local Catholic Church was facing a catastrophe and the cathedral was demolished.

After being released in 1979, he resumed leadership in his diocese. He joined the Communist-sponsored Chinese diocesan conference when it was established in 1980, but he refused to establish a branch of the Chinese Patriotic Catholic Association in the diocese. In 1982, he secretly consecrated the priest Li Weidao to Bishop of the Roman Catholic Diocese of Lu'an, and father Augustine Zheng Shouduo to Bishop of the Roman Catholic Diocese of Xinjiang. On April 29, 1986, he gave a consecration to Peter Chen Bolu as Bishop of the Roman Catholic Diocese of Yongnian. On February 22, 1991, he consecrated 71-year-old Father Joseph Sun Yuanmou to his auxiliary bishop, also in secret. He died on December 21, 1991.

Catholic Church titles
Previous: Joseph Gao Zonghan	Bishop of the Roman Catholic Diocese of Hongdong; 1950–1991	Next: Joseph Sun Yuanmo
