= Mother of Grace Cathedral, Daming =

Mother of Grace Cathedral
- 宠爱之母主教座堂
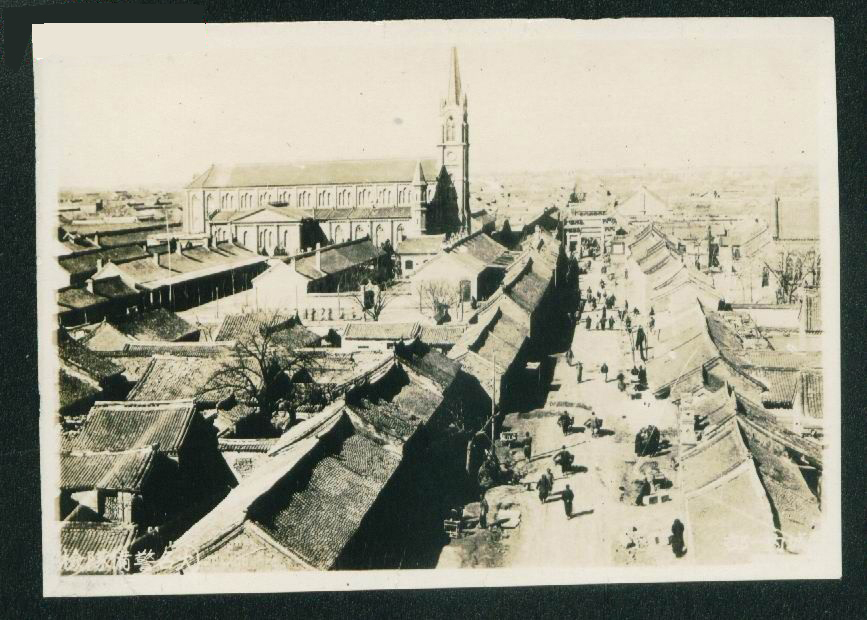
- Mother of Grace Cathedral
- 36°16′42″N 115°08′54″E
- Location: Daming
- Country: China
- Denomination: Roman Catholic Church

The Mother of Grace Cathedral (Chinese: 宠爱之母主教座堂), also alternatively called Church of Our Lady of Grace (Chinese: 大名宠爱之母堂), is a religious building of the Catholic Church which is located in Daming County in Hebei province in the People's Republic of China.

The construction of the church began in 1918 and lasted three years being driven by Catholics of France. It serves as the headquarters of the Diocese of Daming (Dioecesis Tamimensis, 教區大名) that was created on July 10, 1947, replacing an earlier apostolic prefecture.

The cathedral follows the Roman or Latin rite. It covers an area of 1220 square meters, can accommodate more than 1,000 people kneeling in the church. It highlights a bell tower 42 meters high, and inlaid bronze statue of the Virgin Mary with Jesus.

== See also ==
- Roman Catholicism in China
- Monastery of Mary, Mother of Grace
