= Liu Heita =

- Reign: 622–623
- Died: 623
Full name
- Family name: Líu (劉); Given name: Hēità (黑闥)
Era name and dates
- Tiānzao (天造) of Handong: 622–623
- Dynasty: Sui and Tang dynasties

Liu Heita (Chinese: 劉黑闥) (died c.March 623) was an agrarian rebel leader during China's transition period from the Sui dynasty to the Tang dynasty, who initially successively served under Hao Xiaode (郝孝德), Li Mi, and Wang Shichong. He eventually followed Dou Jiande the Prince of Xia. After Dou was executed by Emperor Gaozu of Tang in 621 and his territory was taken by Tang, Liu rose to avenge Dou, and briefly recaptured Dou's territory, north of the Yellow River.

Liu was then defeated by the Tang general Li Shimin (the eventual Emperor Taizong) and then Li Shimin's brother Li Jiancheng, the Crown Prince.

In 623, Liu was captured by his one-time subordinate Zhuge Dewei (諸葛德威) and executed.

== Service under Hao Xiaode, Li Mi, Wang Shichong, and Dou Jiande ==
Little is known about Liu Heita's background, and it is not known when he was born. He was from Zhangnan (漳南, in modern Handan, Hebei)—the same county as Dou Jiande—and was said to be brave and quick in reaction from his youth. He was also said to favor drinking and gambling, much to his father's and brothers' dismay. He became friendly with Dou, and whenever he lacked money, Dou would support him. He eventually joined agrarian rebels rising against Sui dynasty rule, and he initially followed Hao Xiaode (郝孝德), and then after Hao joined Li Mi's forces, served under Li. After Li was defeated by Wang Shichong, then a Sui general, in 618, as Wang knew of Liu's ferocity, he made Liu a cavalry officer, but he thought little of Wang's actions, and often secretly laughed at Wang.

In 619, Liu was serving in the army of Wang's newly established state of Zheng (as Wang had the final Sui emperor, Yang Tong, yield the throne to him earlier that year), defending Xinxiang (新鄉, in modern Xinxiang, Henan), when he was captured by Li Shiji, a Tang dynasty general who had been forced to submit to and serve Dou's state of Xia. (Note: The account that Liu was captured by Li Shiji is contained in the original edition of the Old Book of Tang which was then adopted by, among others, the New Book of Tang and the Zizhi Tongjian. However, the annotations to the Old Book of Tang indicate that Liu was not captured by Li Shiji, but had fled to Dou on his own account.) Dou made Liu a general and created him the Duke of Handong. He often had Liu command guerilla forces to make surprise attacks, and sometimes covertly entering enemy territory for intelligence purposes. It was said that Liu won many victories under Dou.

== Uprising against Tang ==
In 621, with Wang Shichong's state of Zheng under attack by the Tang general Li Shimin the Prince of Qin (the eventual Emperor Taizong) and in desperate straits, Dou Jiande believed that if Zheng were destroyed by Tang, his own Xia state would be cornered. He therefore launched his army, seeking to save Zheng's capital Luoyang. Li Shimin engaged him at the Battle of Hulao, and Dou was captured. Wang then surrendered. The Xia forces considered continuing to resist, but under the leadership of the official Qi Shanxing (齊善行), they surrendered Xia territory to Tang.

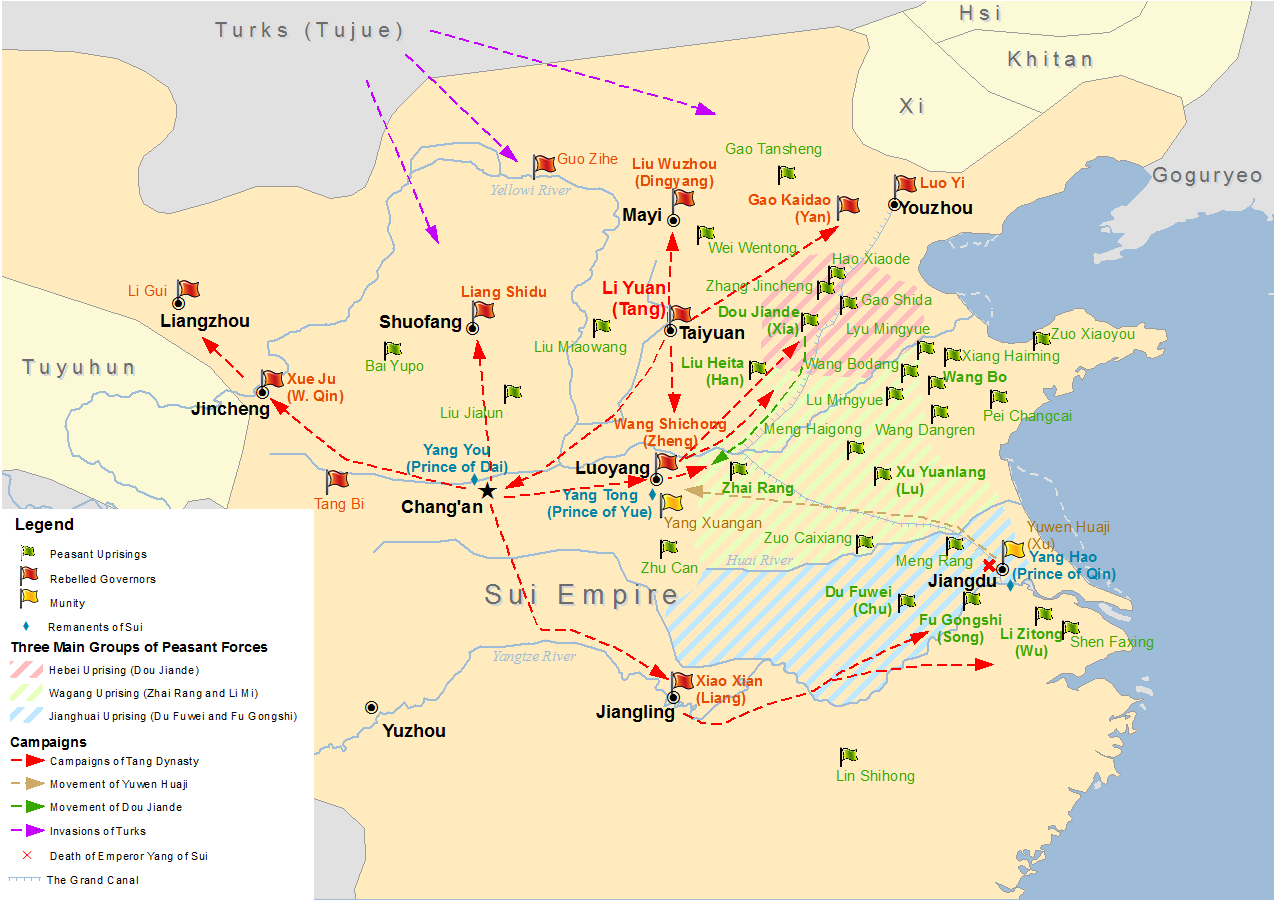
Map showing major uprisings and rebellions in the last years of Sui dynasty.

However, subsequently, Dou was executed by Emperor Gaozu of Tang (Li Shimin's father). The former Xia generals and officials, who had returned to civilian life but who had been often harassed by Tang officials and worried that they would also be executed, gathered secretly and considered rising against Tang rule. After they, led by Gao Yaxian (高雅賢), were informed by fortunetellers that their leader should be someone named Liu, they first offered their leadership to the general Liu Ya (劉雅), who refused (and was then killed by them). They instead offered the leadership to Liu Heita, who was then retired and tending to his garden, and he accepted. In fall 621, they officially rose and captured Zhangnan. The former Xia soldiers gradually came out of retirement and joined him, and Liu offered sacrifices to Dou's spirit, declaring that the Xia forces had risen to avenge him. His uprising was echoed by another agrarian leader, Xu Yuanlang, who had submitted to Tang but by now was nominally submitting to him.

Tang's emperor Gaozu initially sent his cousin Li Shentong (李神通) the Prince of Huai'an against Liu, in conjunction with the Tang official Li Yi the Prince of Yan. Liu defeated Li Shentong, however, at Raoyang (饒陽, in modern Hengshui, Hebei). Liu then defeated Li Yi as well, and Liu's fame spread through the region. He also entered into an alliance with another agrarian leader, Gao Kaidao the Prince of Yan, as well as the Eastern Turks (Dongtujue). Around the new year 622, Liu defeated Li Xiaochang (李孝常, the son of a cousin of Emperor Gaozu) and Li Shiji as well and recovered all of former Xia territory—the region north of the Yellow River. Emperor Gaozu, now realizing that Liu was a major threat, decided to send Li Shimin and another son, Li Yuanji the Prince of Qi, to attack Liu. Meanwhile, in spring 622, Liu claimed the title of Prince of Handong. He organized his government in the same manner Dou did, retaining most of former Xia officials and generals. Historians commented that he was even more fierce and resolute in military actions than Dou. He set his capital at Mingzhou (now Guangfu), the same location as Dou's capital.

== Defeat and death ==
Li Shimin arrived from the south as Liu was besieging Quzhou. Li Yi was coming from the north and the two Tang generals planned to capture the northern road from the Yellow River through Mingzhou to Yuzhou (Beijing), combining their forces and isolating the rebels from their Turkish allies. Liu split his forces. He was able to capture Luo Shixin (羅士信) and, when Luo refused to join the rebels, had him executed. The other wing of his forces were defeated by Li Yi.

Eventually, the Tang and Handong forces stalemated across the Ming River for more than 60 days. Both sides tried to attack each other, without success. Meanwhile, Li Shimin set up a dam upstream on the Ming River. When Liu attacked, Li Shimin had the dam destroyed, and much of the Handong army was drowned. Liu was able to flee with his general Wang Xiaohu (王小胡), but Handong defenses otherwise collapsed. Liu fled to the Eastern Turks (Dongtujue), and Handong territory fell into Tang hands.

In summer 622, Liu, with Turkish reinforcements, tried to return to the region. Li Yi was unable to stop him. With Li Shimin having already returned to Chang'an at that point, Emperor Gaozu sent another son of a cousin, Li Daoxuan (李道玄) the Prince of Huaiyang, to attack Liu, along with Li Yuanji. However, Liu's army won battle after battle, and in winter 622, Liu engaged Li Daoxuan at Xiabo (下博, in modern Hengshui), defeating and killing Li Daoxuan. Within half a month, Liu again recovered all of former Xia territory. Li Yuanji feared his power and hesitated at engaging him.

Meanwhile, Emperor Gaozu's oldest son, Li Jiancheng the Crown Prince, was by now in an intense rivalry with Li Shimin, as he feared that Li Shimin had the intent to seize the throne for himself rather than yielding to Li Jiancheng as the older brother. When Emperor Gaozu considered sending Li Shimin again, Li Jiancheng, at the suggestion of his staff members Wang Gui and Wei Zheng, volunteered. Emperor Gaozu therefore sent him. Meanwhile, Liu's forces became bogged down while sieging Tang's Wei Prefecture (魏州, in modern Handan as well), and when Li Jiancheng and Li Yuanji arrived, Liu's forces ran out of food supplies and collapsed. Liu was able to flee, but in spring 623, as his flight, with only about 100 guards, took him to Rao Prefecture (饒州, in modern Hengshui), his prefect of Rao Prefecture, Zhuge Dewei, welcomed him into the city and held a feast for him. In the middle of the feast, however, Zhuge ambushed him and his guards, capturing them and delivering them to Li Jiancheng. Li Jiancheng had Liu Heita and his brother Liu Shishan (劉十善) executed in the marketplace of his former capital Mingzhou. Before his death, Liu Heita lamented:

I was tending my garden. It was those people led by Gao Yaxian who brought me to this point.

== Notes ==
Regnal titles
Preceded by Dou Jiande (Prince of Xia)	Ruler of China (Hebei); 621–623	Succeeded by Emperor Gaozu of Tang
