= Joseph Hou Jinde =

- Bishop of the Roman Catholic Diocese of Shunde
- Church: Cathedral in Xingtai
- Province: Roman Catholic Archdiocese of Beijing
- Diocese: Roman Catholic Diocese of Shunde
- Installed: 1989
- Term ended: 20 May 1994
- Predecessor: Xiao Liren
- Successor: Guo Jinjun

Orders
- Ordination: 1945 by Joseph Cui Shouxun

Personal details
- Born: 1918
- Died: May 22, 1994 (aged 75–76)
- Denomination: Roman Catholic

Joseph Hou Jinde (simplified Chinese: 候进德; traditional Chinese: 候進德; pinyin: Hóu Jìndé; 1918 - 22 May 1994) was a Chinese Catholic priest and Bishop of the Roman Catholic Diocese of Shunde between 1989 and 1994.

== Biography ==
Hou was born in 1918. He was ordained a priest in 1945 by Bishop Joseph Cui Shouxun. In 1947, he studied at Fu Jen Catholic University in Beijing and then taught at a teacher's college for two years. Bishop Joseph Cui Shouxun died in the early 1950s, and was succeeded by Communist-nominated Bishop Wang Shouqian in 1958. Wang died in 1964 and no more bishops were appointed. During the Cultural Revolution, he forced to work in the fields instead of preaching Catholicism. He was released in the early 1980s. He was elected administrator of the Roman Catholic Diocese of Shunde in 1987, and nominated as bishop there in the following year. On October 28, 1989, he was ordained Bishop of the Roman Catholic Diocese of Shunde without a papal mandate, Bishop Peter Chen Bolu was chief secretary. It was the first bishop in the "open church" conducted in Chinese, previously it was always in Latin. He died on May 22, 1994.

Catholic Church titles
Previous: Xiao Liren	Bishop of the Roman Catholic Diocese of Shunde; 1989–1994	Next: Guo Jinjun
