= Peter Liu =

Peter Liu may refer to:

- Peter Liu Cheng-chung (born 1951), Taiwanese Roman Catholic bishop in Kaohsiung
- Peter Liu Gen-zhu (born 1966), Chinese Roman Catholic bishop in Hongdong
