= Ming Prefecture (Hebei) =

Historical administrative division in Hebei, China

- Chinese: 洺州
- Literal meaning: Ming River Prefecture
Transcriptions
Standard Mandarin
- Hanyu Pinyin: Míngzhōu
- Wade–Giles: Ming Chou

Ming Prefecture, also known by its Chinese name Mingzhou, was a prefecture (zhou) of imperial China in present-day Hebei Province. It existed intermittently from AD 578 to 1278. Its seat—also known at the time as Mingzhou—was at Guangfu in Handan's Yongnian District.

== Geography ==
The administrative region of Ming Prefecture in the Tang dynasty is under the administration of modern Handan in southern Hebei. It probably includes parts of modern:

- Handan
- Handan County
- Qiu County
- Feixiang County
- Wu'an City
- Jize County
- Yongnian County
- Quzhou County
