= Guangfu, Hebei =

Preserved Ming-era town in Hebei, China

Coordinates: 36°42′07″N 114°43′24″E

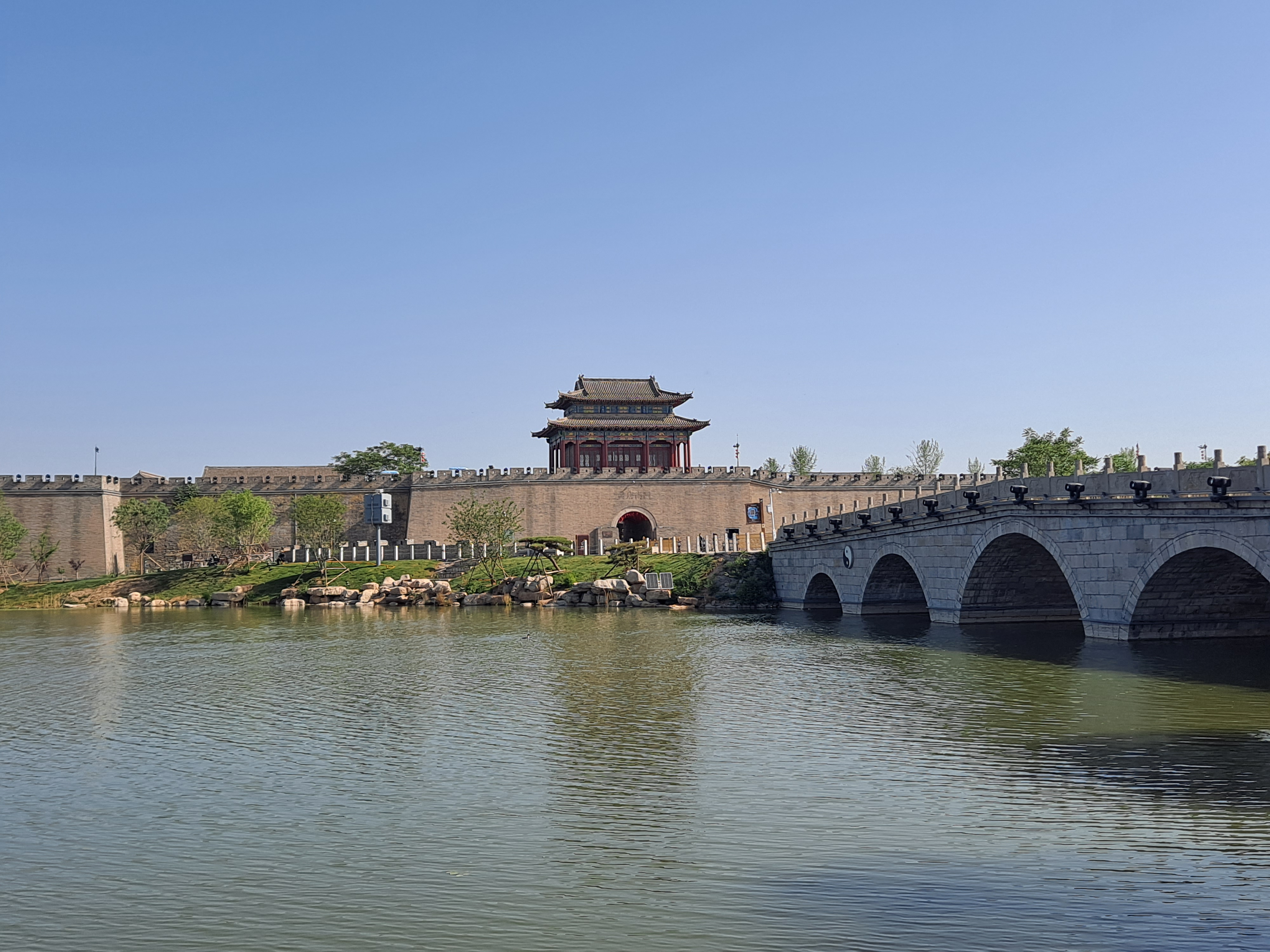
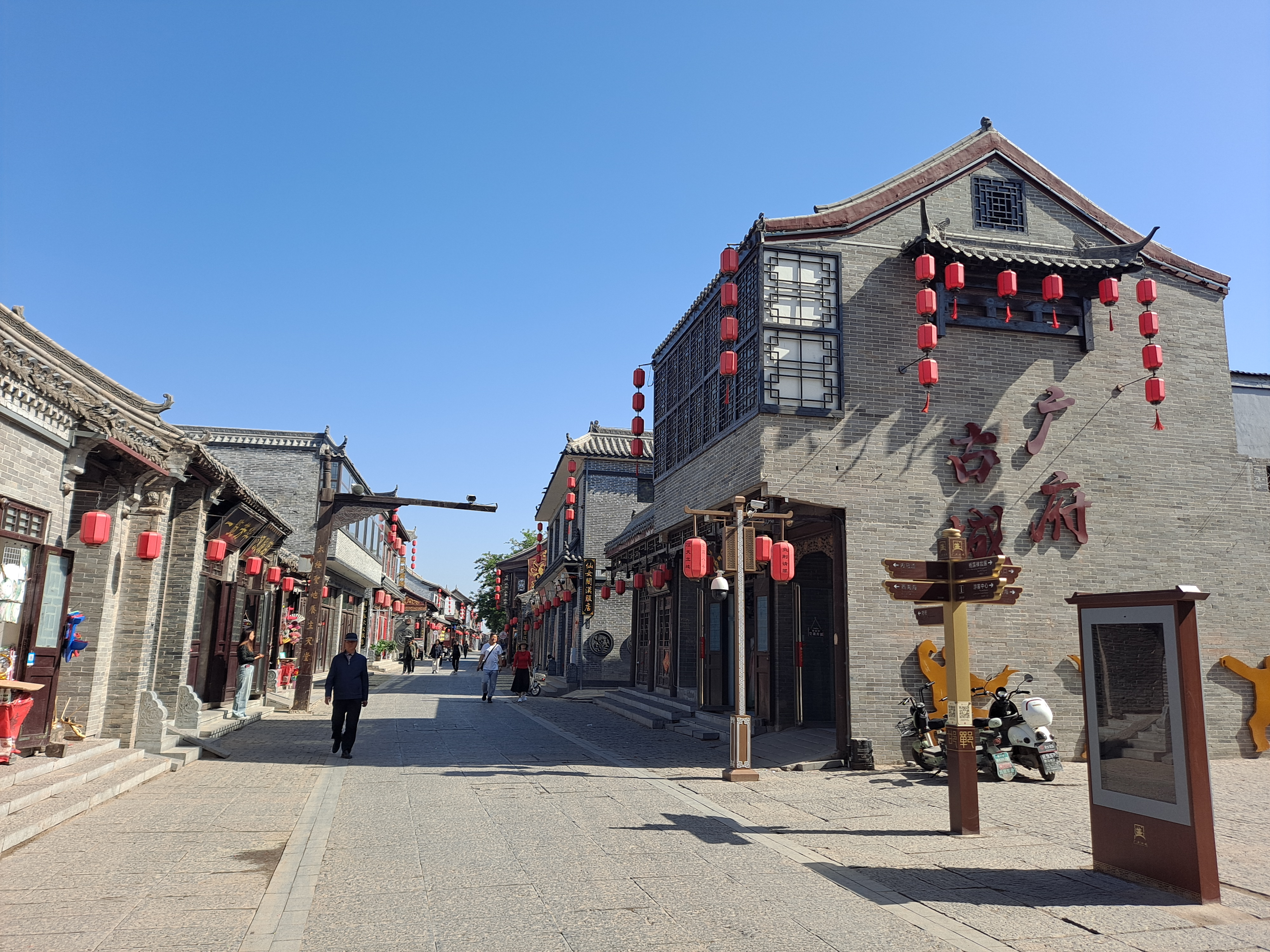
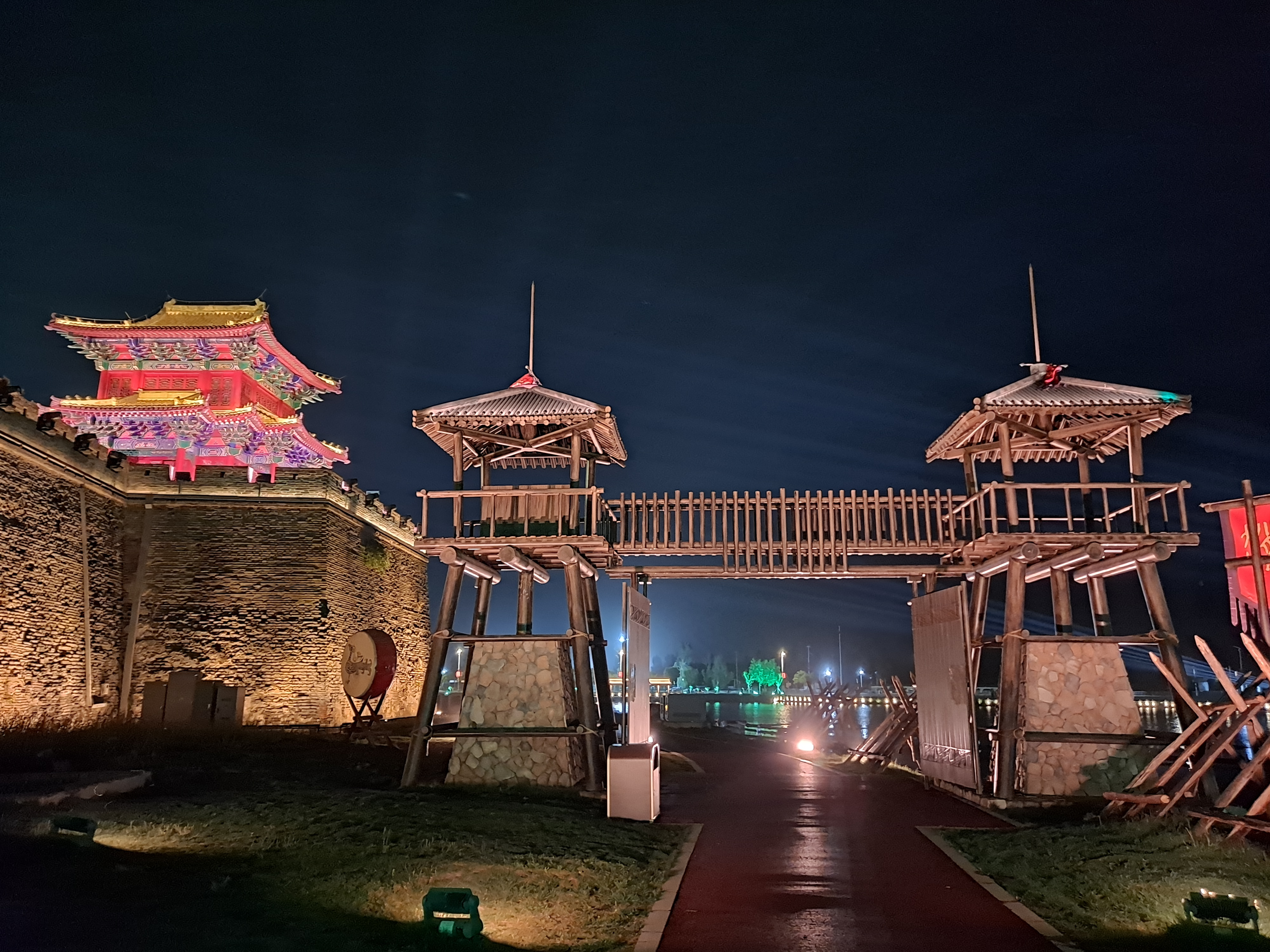
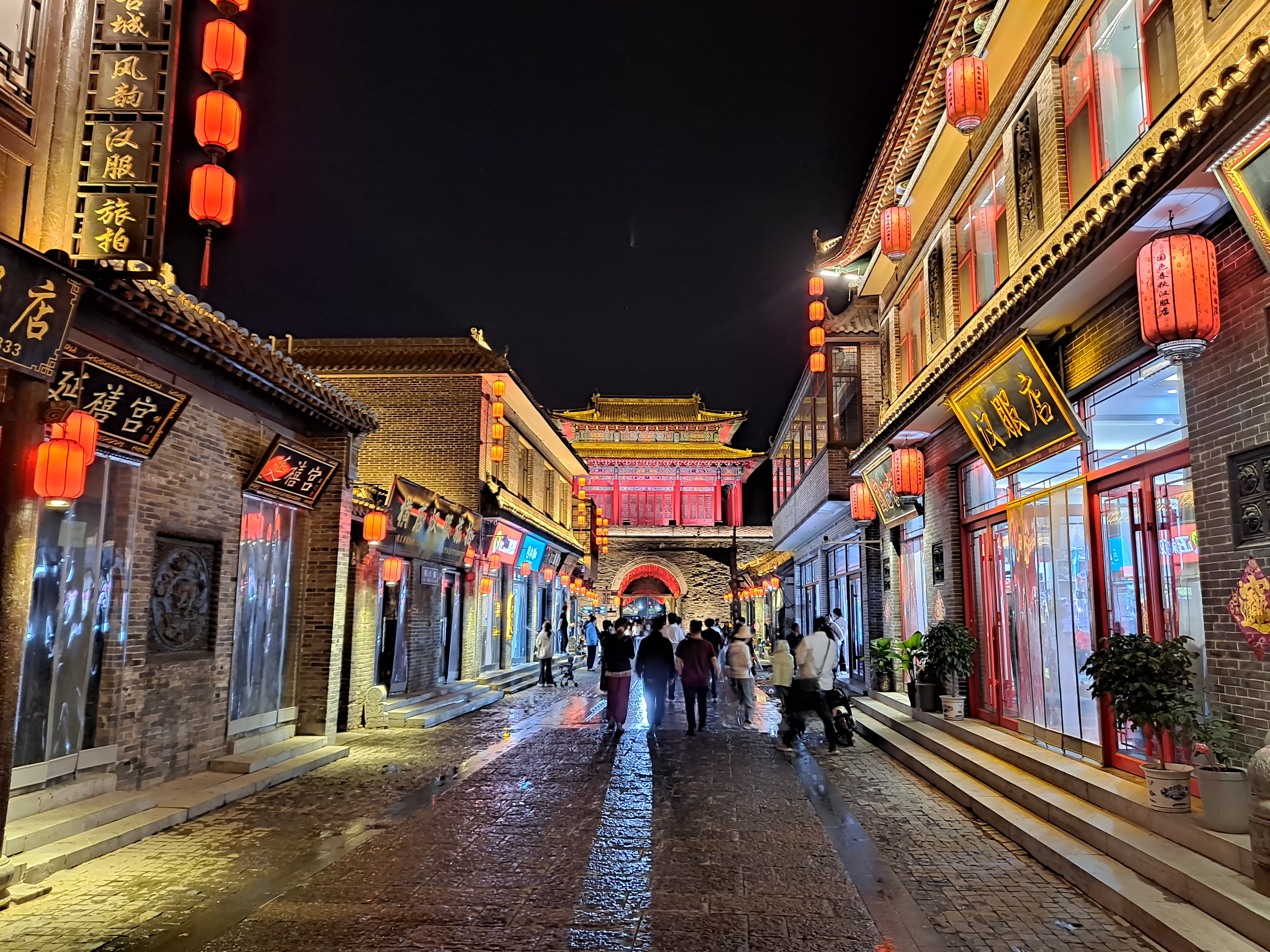
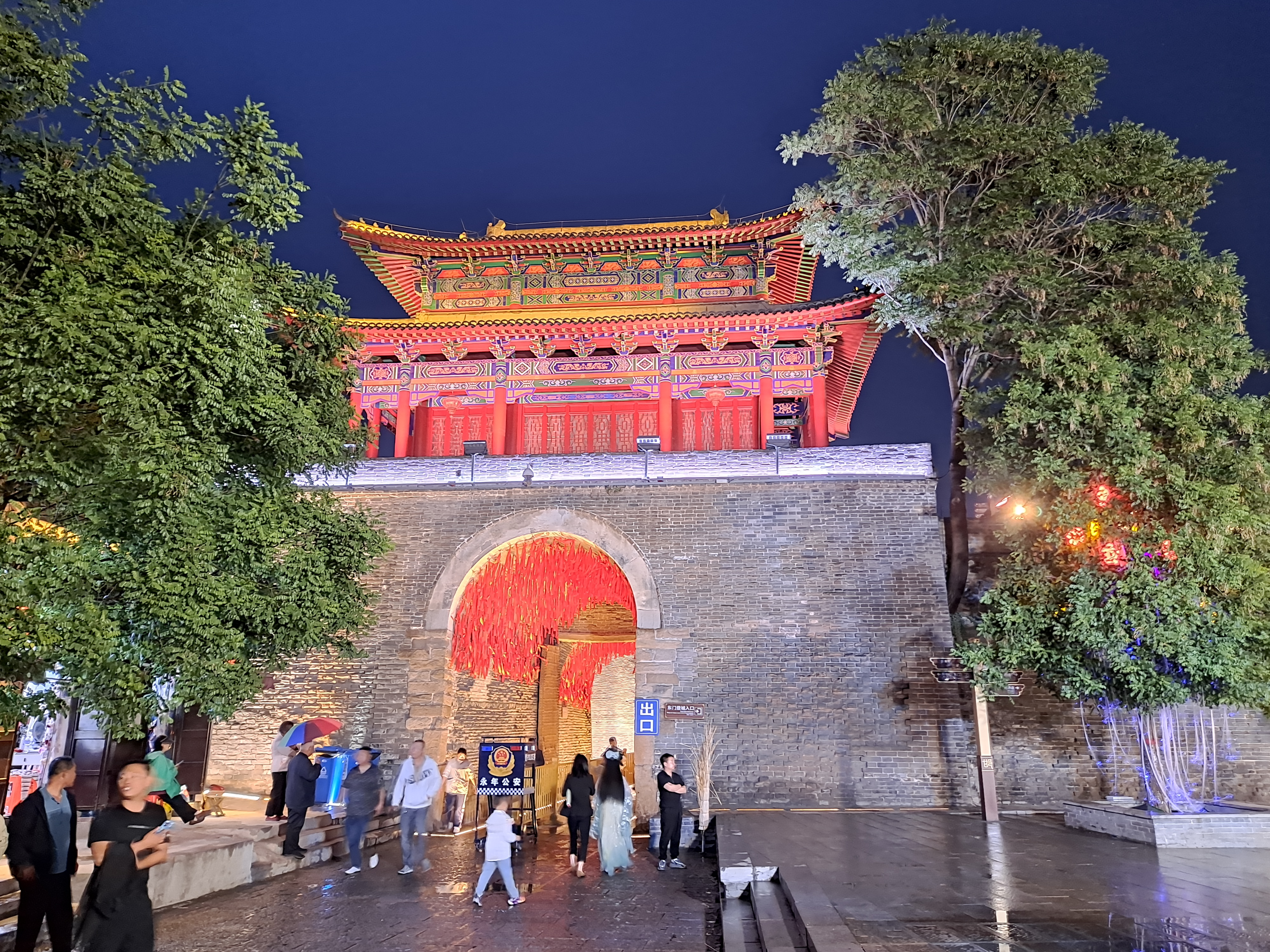
- Guangfu Ancient City South Gate panoramic view South Gate tower architectural detail Inner city traditional courtyard South Gate moat and defensive structures South Gate entrance pathway Layout of the Guangfu Ancient City Scenic Area
- Traditional Chinese: 廣府鎮
- Simplified Chinese: 广府镇
- Literal meaning: Town of the Expansive Prefecture
Transcriptions
Standard Mandarin
- Hanyu Pinyin: Guǎngfǔ zhèn
- Wade–Giles: Kuang-fu Chên

Alternative Chinese name
- Traditional Chinese: 廣府古城
- Simplified Chinese: 广府古城
- Literal meaning: Ancient City of the Expansive Prefecture
Transcriptions
Standard Mandarin
- Hanyu Pinyin: Guǎngfǔ gǔchéng
- Wade–Giles: Kuang-fu Ku-ch‘êng

Guangfu is a town in Yongnian District, Handan, Hebei, China. It comprises the Guangfu Ancient City, a AAAAA-rated tourist attraction that preserves the appearance of a Ming-era Chinese town through its architecture, large city walls, and expansive moat.

== Names ==
Former names
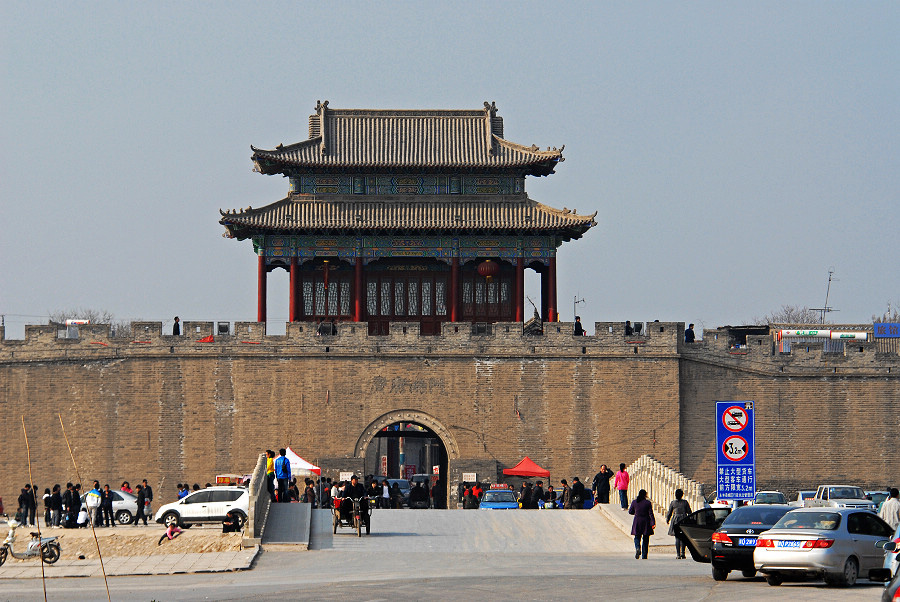
- Southern gate

Guangping
- Traditional Chinese: 廣平府
- Simplified Chinese: 广平府
- Literal meaning: Seat of Guangping Prefecture
Transcriptions
Standard Mandarin
- Hanyu Pinyin: Guǎngpíngfǔ
- Wade–Giles: Kuang-p‘ing Fu (Note: The name also formerly appeared in French-influenced sources as "Kouang-ping-fou".)

Mingzhou
- Chinese: 洺州
- Literal meaning: Seat of Ming Prefecture
Transcriptions
Standard Mandarin
- Hanyu Pinyin: Míngzhōu
- Wade–Giles: Ming-chou

Yongnian
- Chinese: 永年城
- Literal meaning: Yongnian City
Transcriptions
Standard Mandarin
- Hanyu Pinyin: Yǒngniánchéng
- Wade–Giles: Yung-nien Ch‘êng

"Guangfu" is an elision of the town's older name Guangpingfu, referring to its former status as the seat of Guangping ("Expansively Pacified" or "Peaceful") Prefecture under the Ming. The name was first borne by the town under the Han.

By the Tang, it was known as Mingzhou from its former prefecture, itself named after the nearby Ming River. It has also been known as Yongnian ("Longevity") from the name of its former county and present district.

== Geography ==
Guangfu is located in the middle of Yongnian Marsh in the western reaches of Handan's Yongnian District.

== History ==
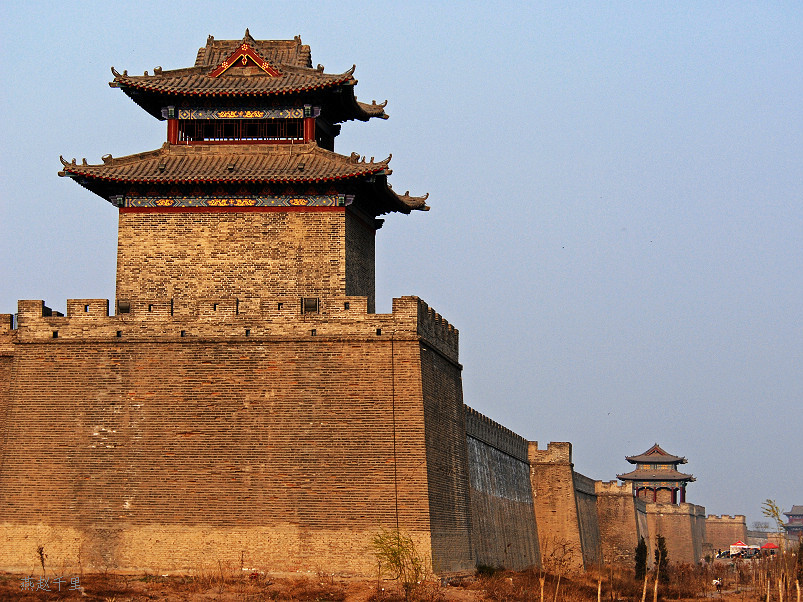
One of the Ming-style guard towers overlooking the city

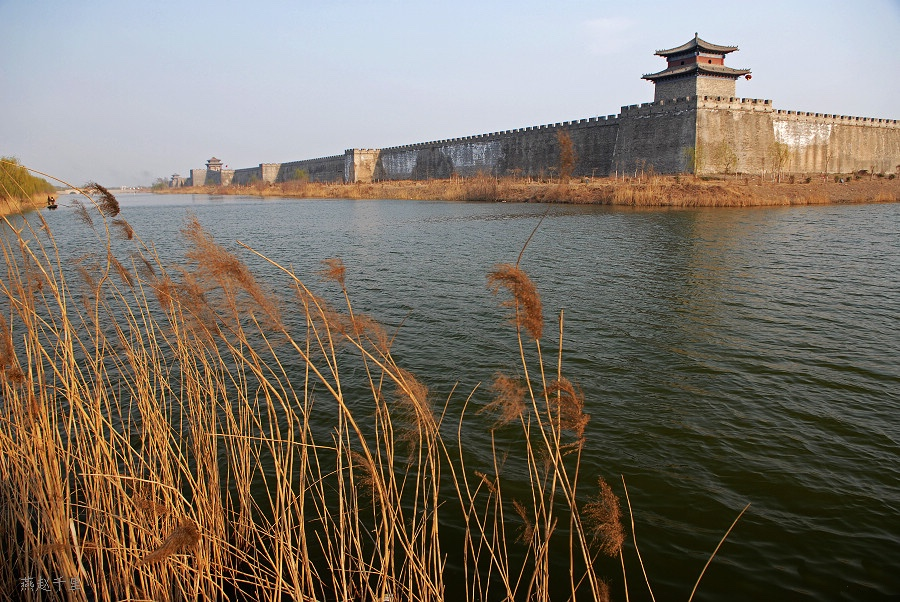
The city walls

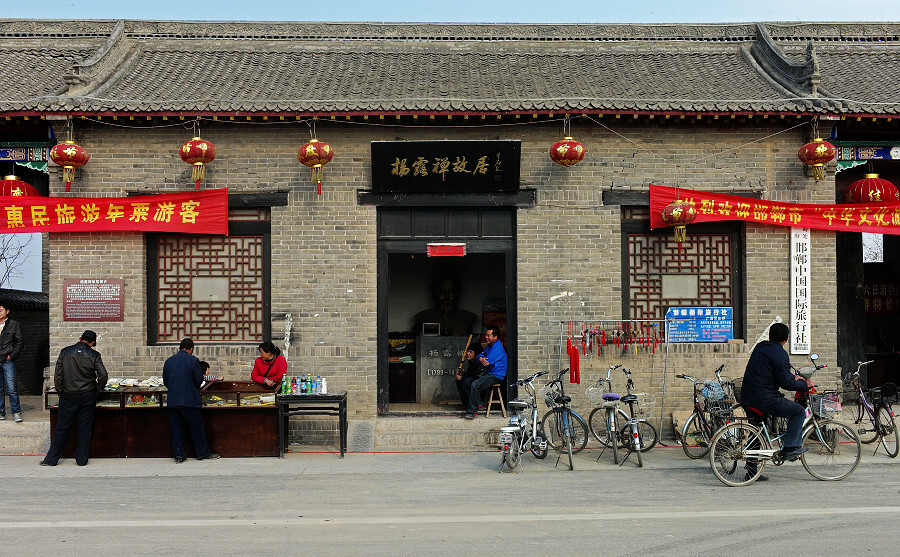
Yang Luchan's former residence

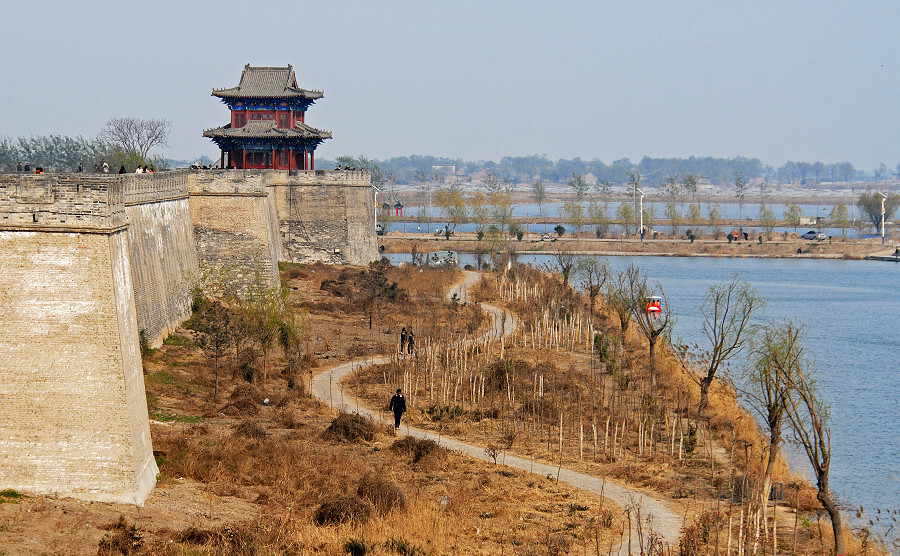
People wandering beside the town's moat

The area around Guangfu has been typically marshy since the earliest historical records. Guangfu itself was first settled during the Spring and Autumn period around the 6th century BC. It made up part of Jin during the Zhou, and part of Zhao during the Warring States period. Under the Qin, it was organized as part of Handan Commandery.

During the fall of the Sui, it served as the capital of Dou Jiande's short-lived "Xia Principality" after he captured it in AD 619. At the time, the city lay on the principal road running from points south of the Yellow River northeast to Youzhou (now within Beijing) and Korea. When Dou captured Li Shentong (李神通), the Prince of Huai'an, the Tang scion was held in Guangfu's prison. When Dou was captured at the 621 Battle of Hulao, a few hundred of his cavalry escaped to his capital, looted its treasury, and then yielded the town to the victorious Tang. After Dou was executed in Chang'an, his cavalry officer Liu Heita again rose in rebellion, defeating the Tang near Guangfu in late 621 with Turkic assistance. He then occupied the city and made it his capital, proclaiming his realm the "Principality of Handong". Li Shimin—the future Emperor Taizong—defeated him by erecting a dam across the nearby Ming River and then bursting it when it was able to flood most of the Handong army. Liu was able to return to the field with more Turkic help but again defeated. He was executed in Guangping's marketplace in the first month of 623.

Guangfu's present city walls began as earthen ramparts during the Tang (7th–9th centuries) and were built up with masonry under the Yuan (13th–14th centuries) and Ming (14th–17th centuries).

During the 19th century, under the Qing, it was the home to Yang Luchan and Wu Yuxiang, the founders of Yang and Wu-style tai chi, two of the largest schools of tai chi in the world. Horace William Houlding's South Chihli Mission opened a Protestant church in the town in 1905. It was overseen in its early years by Katharine Ewald.

The 1.5 km^{2} (0.58 sq mi) historical area within the city walls has been refurbished since China's opening up, with current construction mimicking the town's appearance under the Ming. Yang and Wu's former homes have been converted into public museums honoring their lives and schools of tai chi. The town was named a AAAAA tourist attraction by China's National Tourism Administration in 2017.

== In popular culture ==
The CCTV drama Guangfu Tai Chi (《广府太极传奇》, Guǎngfǔ Tàijí Chuánqí) was filmed on location in the city in 2007 and aired in 2010.

== See also ==
- AAAAA Tourist Attractions of China
