= Ming River =

Stream in Hebei, China

- Chinese: 洺河
- Literal meaning: Ming River
Transcriptions
Standard Mandarin
- Hanyu Pinyin: Mínghé
- Wade–Giles: Ming Ho

Former name
- Chinese: 洺水
- Literal meaning: Ming River
Transcriptions
Standard Mandarin
- Hanyu Pinyin: Míngshuǐ
- Wade–Giles: Ming Shui

Other names

Qin River
- Traditional Chinese: 寢水
- Simplified Chinese: 寝水
Transcriptions
Standard Mandarin
- Hanyu Pinyin: Qǐnshuǐ
- Wade–Giles: Ch‘in Shui

Qianbu River
- Chinese: 千步水
Transcriptions
Standard Mandarin
- Hanyu Pinyin: Qiānbùshuǐ
- Wade–Giles: Ch‘ien Pu Shui

Nanyi River
- Chinese: 南易水
Transcriptions
Standard Mandarin
- Hanyu Pinyin: Nányìshuǐ
- Wade–Giles: Nan I Shui

The Ming River, also formerly known as the Qin, Qianbu, and Nanyi River, is a tributary of the Ziya River in Hebei, China.

== History ==
The river gave its name to Imperial China's Ming Prefecture and to its capital Mingzhou, now Guangfu. During the establishment of the Tang, Prince Li Shimin broke a dam across the Ming in order to destroy the rebel army under Liu Heita in year 622.

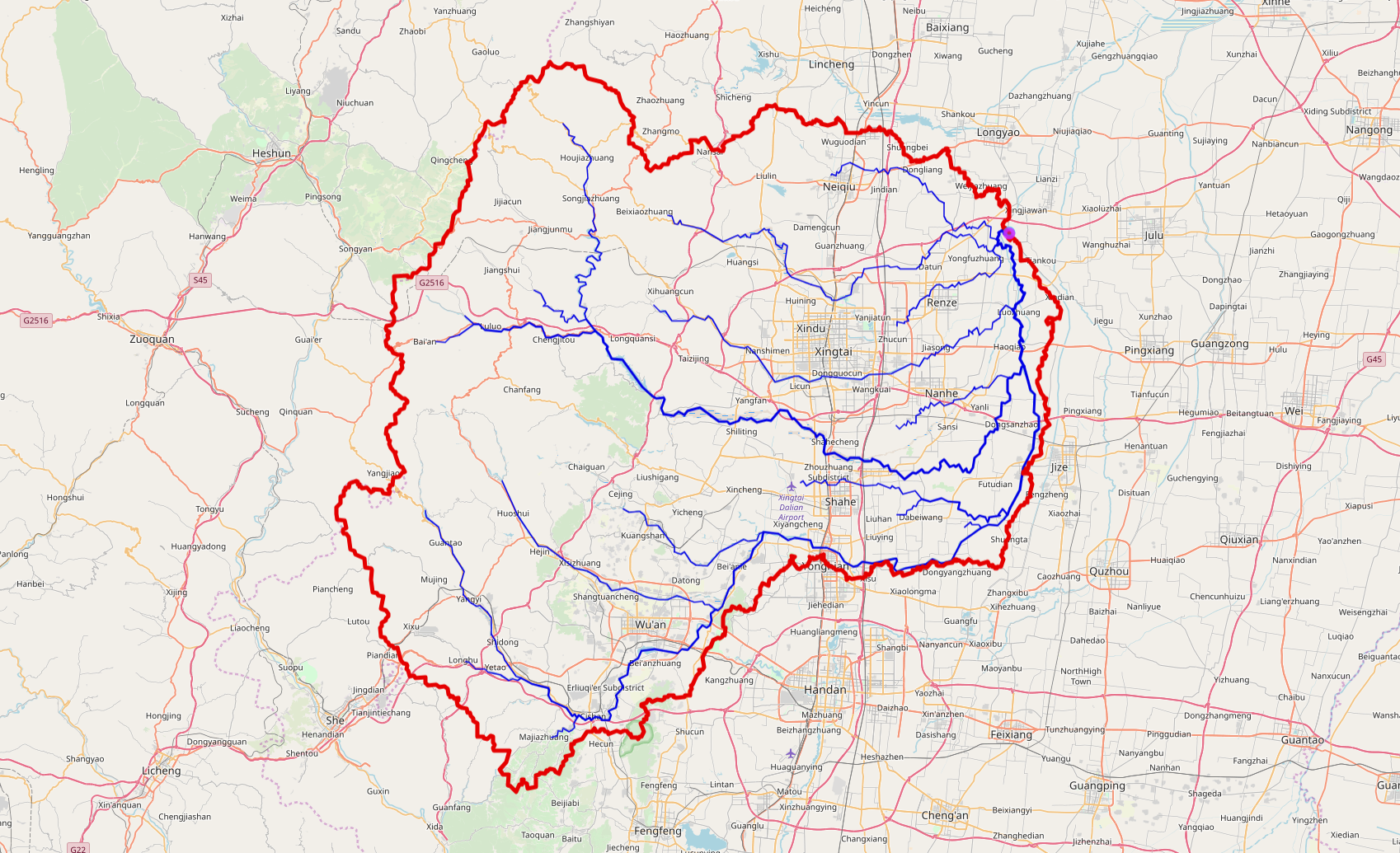
Ming river basin

== See also ==
- Rivers of China
