= Diocese of Daming =

Roman Catholic diocese in China

Coordinates: 36°17′N 115°09′E

Diocese of Daming Dioecesis Tamimensis 教區大名
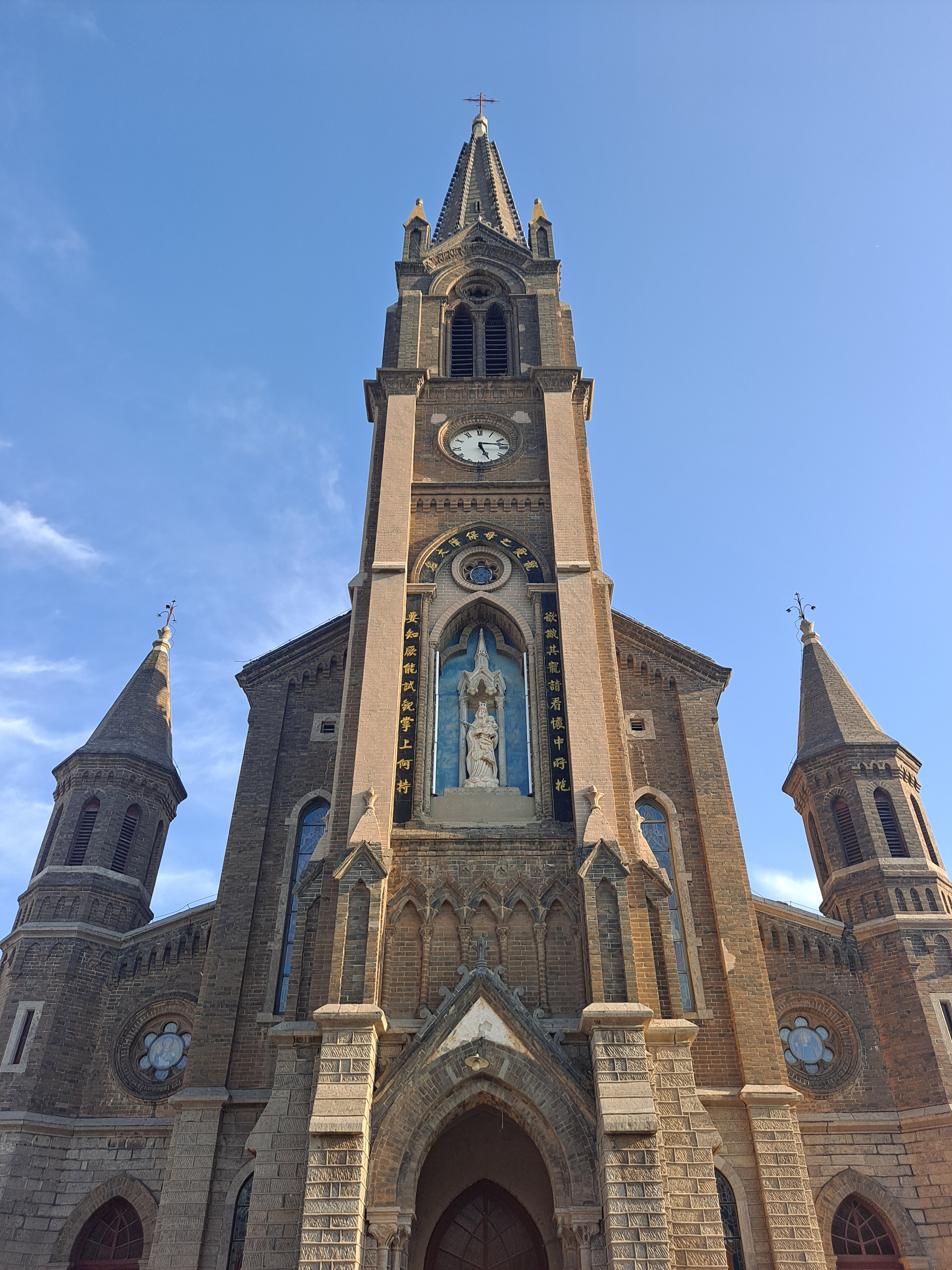

Location
- Country: China
- Ecclesiastical province: Beijing
- Metropolitan: Beijing

Information
- Rite: Latin Rite
- Cathedral: Cathedral of Our Lady of Grace in Daming

Current leadership
- Pope: Leo XIV
- Bishop: Sede Vacante
- Metropolitan Archbishop: Joseph Li Shan

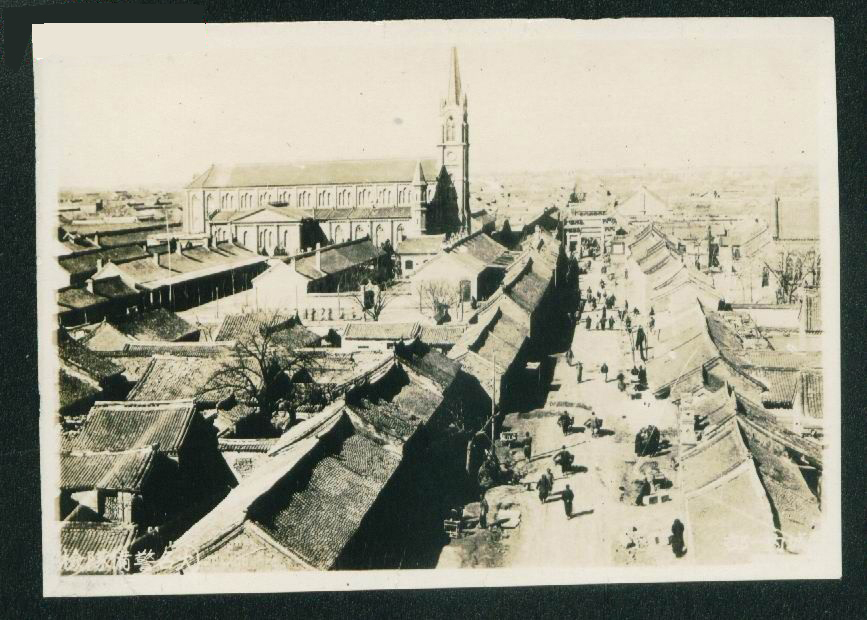

The Roman Catholic Diocese of Daming (Latin: Tamimen(sis), Chinese: 大名) is a diocese located in the city of Daming in the ecclesiastical province of Beijing in China.

== History ==
- March 11, 1935: Established as Apostolic Prefecture of Daming 大名 from the Apostolic Vicariate of Xianxian 獻縣
- July 10, 1947: Promoted as Diocese of Daming 大名

== Leadership ==
- Bishops of Daming 大名 (Roman Rite)
  - Stephen Yang Xiangtai, Bishop Coadjutor (1996–1999) and a Diocesan Bishop (1999–2016)
  - Fr. Gaspar Lischerong, S.J. (隆其化) (Apostolic Administrator July 10, 1947 – 1972)
- Prefects Apostolic of Daming 大名 (Roman Rite)
  - Fr. Nicola Szarvas, S.J. (查宗夏) (January 31, 1936 – 1947)
