= Beifeng Township =

Beifeng Township 北峰乡
- Rural Township
- Běifēng Xiāng
- Location in Hebei Location in China
- Coordinates: 36°13′33″N 115°24′52″E
- Country: People's Republic of China
- Province: Hebei
- Prefecture-level city: Handan
- County: Daming

Area
  - Total: 49.41 km^{2} (19.08 sq mi)

Population (2010)
  - Total: 33,111
  - Density: 670.1/km^{2} (1,736/sq mi)
- Time zone: UTC+8 (China Standard)

Beifeng Township (Chinese: 北峰乡; pinyin: Běifēng Xiāng) is a rural township located in Daming County, Handan, Hebei, China. According to the 2010 census, Beifeng Township had a population of 33,111, including 16,612 males and 16,499 females. The population was distributed as follows: 8,365 people aged under 14, 22,192 people aged between 15 and 64, and 2,554 people aged over 65.

== See also ==
- List of township-level divisions of Hebei
