= Han Dingxiang =

Chinese Roman Catholic bishop

John Han Dingxiang (Chinese: 韩鼎祥; May 17, 1937 – September 9, 2007) was an underground Roman Catholic bishop of Yongnian, a division of Hebei province, in China. Han was detained for much of his ministry for his loyalty to the Vatican as opposed to the Chinese government-controlled Roman Catholic Church.

== Early life ==
Han Dingxiang was born on May 17, 1937, in Hebei province in northern China. In 1960, Han was sentenced to and served 19 years in a Chinese labor camp during the rule of Mao Zedong. It is not known whether his sentence was related to religious activity.

== Catholic Church ==
Han was ordained a Roman Catholic priest in 1986. He was elevated by the Vatican to the Bishop of Yongnian Diocese in 1989 just three years later. Han recognized the pope as head of the Chinese Catholic Church, not the government in Beijing. The Chinese government requires that all members of Christian denominations register and worship in state sponsored churches. By law, Christians of all denominations must worship in state-registered churches. Chinese Catholics, such as Han, who recognize the Pope in Rome as head of the Church must worship in underground churches, often called house churches.

The Chinese government allows Chinese Catholics to recognize the Pope in Rome as a spiritual leader. However, the government rejects the notion that the Vatican alone has the authority to appoint bishops. The Chinese government often appoints its own bishops to its state controlled Catholic Church. Bishops appointed secretly by the Vatican must practice underground or risk detention and arrest.

Han Dingxiang was detained on eleven separate occasions during his tenure as Bishop of Yongnian. Han last arrest took place in November 1999. Han was reportedly caught leading a religious retreat for Catholic nuns in Shijiazhuang, the capital of Hebei.

Han was still under house arrest or other forms of detention stemming from his 1999 arrest at the time of death in 2007. He had served over eight years and had been kept in several locations, including a housing complex for Chinese police and their families.

Han Dingxiang died on September 9, 2007, at a hospital in China while still in police custody. He was being treated for an undisclosed illness, which was reportedly lung cancer. His family had only recently been notified about his poor health. Han was reportedly cremated and buried just six hours after his death.

The Cardinal Kung Foundation, a Catholic monitoring group based in the United States, urged the Vatican to investigate Han's death.
