= Joseph Sun Jigen =

Roman catholic bishop

- Bishop of the Roman Catholic Diocese of Yongnian
- Province: Hebei
- Diocese: Roman Catholic Diocese of Yongnian
- Installed: 13 October 2021
- Predecessor: Stephen Yang Xiangtai

Orders
- Ordination: 1995 by Bishop Chen Bailu
- Consecration: 21 June 2011 by Stephen Yang Xiangtai

Personal details
- Born: August 2, 1967 (age 59) Fengfeng Mining District, Handan, Hebei, China
- Denomination: Roman Catholic
- Education: Hebei Catholic Theological and Philosophical College
- Motto: QUIA DOMINUS EUM NECESSARIUM HABET / 主要用他

Chinese name
- Traditional Chinese: 孫繼根
- Simplified Chinese: 孙继根
Transcriptions
Standard Mandarin
- Hanyu Pinyin: Sūn Jìgēn

Joseph Sun Jigen (Chinese: 孙继根; born August 2, 1967) is a Chinese Catholic prelate and Coadjutor bishop of the Roman Catholic Diocese of Yongnian from 2011. He was appointed bishop of the Roman catholic diocese of Yongnian on 13 October 2021.

== Biography ==
Sun was born in Fengfeng Mining District of Handan, Hebei, on August 2, 1967. He secondary studied at the High School of Yijing Town. In September 1988 he entered the Hebei Catholic Theological and Philosophical College, where he graduated in August 1992. He was ordained a priest in 1995 by Bishop Chen Bailu. In 2007 he was appointed Coadjutor bishop of the Roman Catholic Diocese of Yongnian by the Holy See. He accepted the episcopacy with the papal mandate on June 21, 2011. On June 26, 2011, Sun was arrested by the local police and released on July 9.
