= Joseph Cui Shouxun =

Roman Catholic bishop

- Bishop of the Roman Catholic Diocese of Yongnian
- Province: Roman Catholic Archdiocese of Beijing
- Diocese: Roman Catholic Diocese of Yongnian
- Installed: June 1, 1929
- Term ended: 1953
- Predecessor: Position established
- Successor: Peter Chen Bolu

Orders
- Ordination: March 19, 1904
- Consecration: June 11, 1933 by Pope Pius XI

Personal details
- Born: Cui Buxian; July 27, 1877 Zhili, Qing Empire
- Died: 1953 (aged 75–76) People's Republic of China
- Denomination: Roman Catholic
- Parents: Cuilian Barui (mother)

Joseph Cui Shouxun (Chinese: 崔守恂; pinyin: Cuī Shǒuxún; 27 July 1877 – 1953) was a Chinese Catholic priest and Bishop of the Roman Catholic Diocese of Yongnian between 1929 and 1953.

== Biography ==
Cui was born Cui Buxian (崔步显) in the village of Xiaodian (小店村), Zhili, Qing Empire on July 27, 1877. His mother Cuilian Barui (崔连芭芮) was a Catholic. He was ordained a priest on March 19, 1904. On June 11, 1933, he was appointed Bishop of the Roman Catholic Diocese of Yongnian by Pope Pius XI. He served until his death in 1953.

Catholic Church titles
| Previous: Position established | Bishop of the Roman Catholic Diocese of Yongnian; 1929–1953 | Next: Peter Chen Bolu |
