= Anzhai =

Anzhai 安寨镇
- Town
- Ānzhài Zhèn
- Location in Hebei Location in China
- Coordinates: 36°40′14″N 114°58′58″E
- Country: People's Republic of China
- Province: Hebei
- Prefecture-level city: Handan
- County: Quzhou

Area
  - Total: 88.83 km^{2} (34.30 sq mi)

Population (2010)
  - Total: 54,641
  - Density: 615.1/km^{2} (1,593/sq mi)
- Time zone: UTC+8 (China Standard)

Anzhai (Chinese: 安寨镇; pinyin: Ānzhài Zhèn) is a town located in Quzhou County, Handan, Hebei, China. According to the 2010 census, Anzhai had a population of 54,641, including 27,477 males and 27,164 females. The population was distributed as follows: 12,848 people aged under 14, 37,654 people aged between 15 and 64, and 4,139 people aged over 65.

== See also ==
- List of township-level divisions of Hebei
