= Diocese of Shunde =

Roman Catholic diocese in China

Coordinates: 37°04′00″N 114°29′30″E

Diocese of Shunde Dioecesis Scioenteanus 天主教顺德教区

Location
- Country: China
- Ecclesiastical province: Beijing
- Metropolitan: Beijing

Statistics
- Area: 4,872 km^{2} (1,881 sq mi)
- Population: Total; Catholics: (as of 1950); 1,150,000; 21,000 (1.8%)

Information
- Denomination: Catholic Church
- Sui iuris church: Latin Church
- Rite: Roman Rite
- Established: 2 March 1933; 93 years ago
- Cathedral: Cathedral in Xingtai

Current leadership
- Pope: Leo XIV
- Bishop: Shi Guangdong
- Metropolitan Archbishop: Joseph Li Shan

The Roman Catholic Diocese of Shunde/Shunteh/Xingtai (Latin: Scioentean(us), Chinese: 順得, 邢台) is a diocese located in the city of Xingtai (Hebei) in the ecclesiastical province of Beijing in China.

== History ==
- 2 March 1933: Established as Apostolic Prefecture of Shundefu 順得府 from the Apostolic Vicariate of Zhengdingfu 正定府
- 13 January 1944: Promoted as Apostolic Vicariate of Shundefu 順得府
- 11 April 1946: Promoted as Diocese of Shunde 順得

== Leadership ==
Bishops of Shunde 順得 (Roman rite):

- Shi Guangdong (2008 – Present)
- Joseph Hou Jinde (28 October 1989 – 20 May 1994)
- Michael Xiao Liren (30 December 1982 – 26 October 1996)
- Inácio Krause, C.M. (see below 11 April 1946 – 1983), resigned

Vicar Apostolic of Shundefu 順得府 (Roman Rite):

- Inácio Krause, C.M. (see below 13 January 1944 – 11 April 1946 see above)

Prefect Apostolic of Shundefu 順得府 (Roman Rite):

- Inácio Krause, C.M. (26 October 1933 – 13 January 1944 see above)
