= Joseph Son =

Joseph Son may refer to:

- Joseph Son Sam-seok (born 1955), South Korean Roman Catholic bishop
- Joe Son (Joseph Hyungmin Son, born 1970), American former mixed martial artist and convicted felon

== See also ==
- Josephson, a surname
- Joe Sun (born 1943), American country music singer
- Joseph Sun (disambiguation)
