= Daming =

Daming may refer to:

- Daming County (大名县), in Hebei, China
- Daming Lake (大明湖), in Jinan, Shandong, China
- Daming Palace, an imperial palace complex of the Tang dynasty
- Daming Temple, a temple located in Yangzhou, Jiangsu, China
- Daming Town, name of several towns in China:
  - Daming, Daming County (大名镇), Hebei
  - Daming, Ningcheng County (大明镇), Chifeng, Inner Mongolia
  - Daming, Diaobingshan (大明镇), Liaoning
  - Daming, Hua County (大明镇), Shaanxi
- Ming Dynasty (大明帝国), ruling dynasty of China from 1368 to 1644
