= Cathedral of Hongtong =

- 洪洞天主教堂
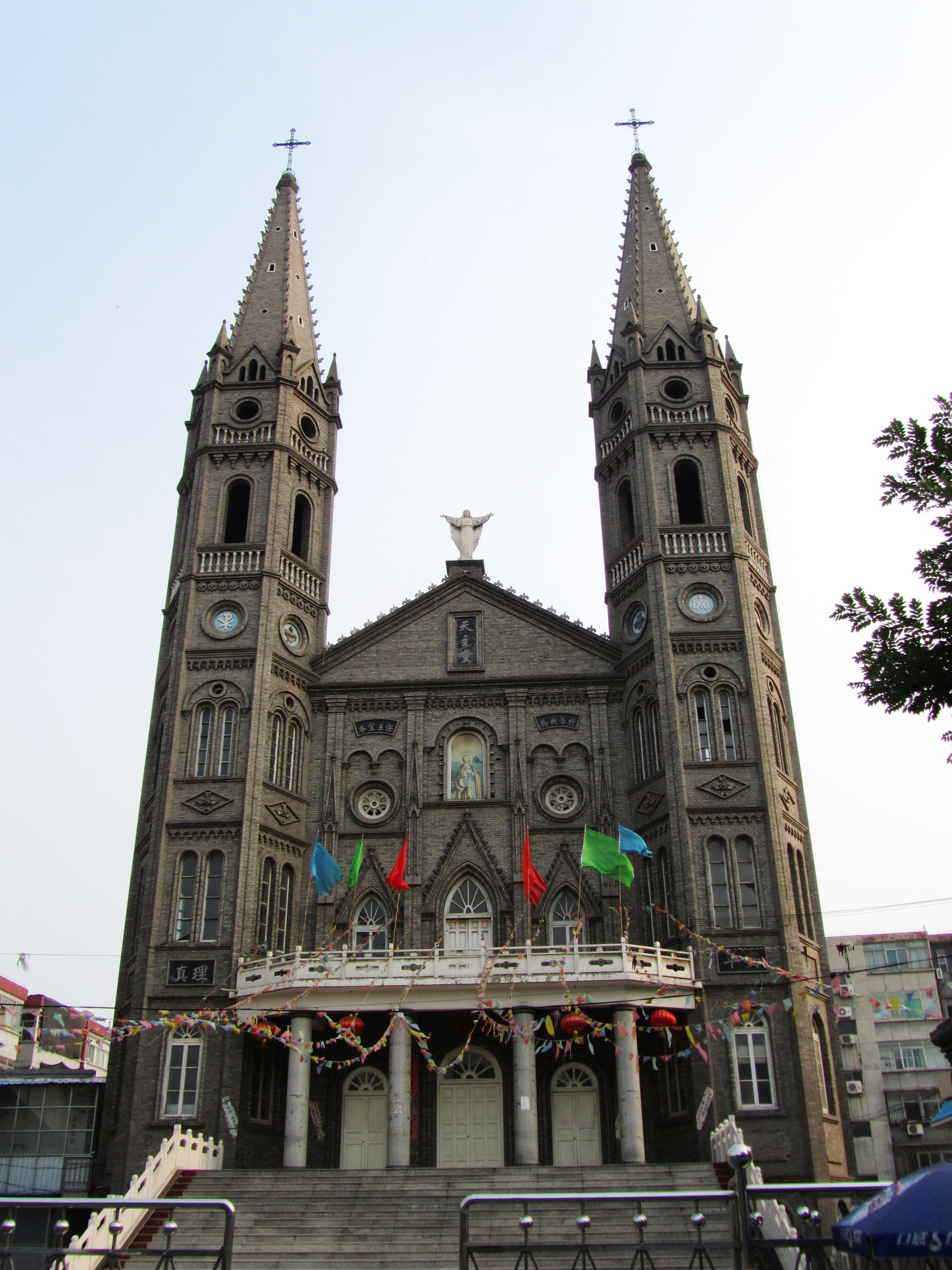
- Cathedral of Hongtong in 2011

- Location in Shanxi
- 36°15′31″N 111°39′58″E
- Location: Hongtong County, Shanxi, China
- Denomination: Roman Catholic

History
- Status: Parish church

Architecture
- Functional status: Active
- Architectural type: Church building
- Style: Gothic architecture
- Completed: 2002 (reconstruction)
- Demolished: 1958

Specifications
- Materials: Granite, bricks

Administration
- Diocese: Roman Catholic Diocese of Hongdong

Cathedral of Hongtong (Chinese: 洪洞天主教堂; pinyin: Hóngtóng Tiānzhǔjiàotáng) is the cathedral of Hongtong County, in Shanxi, China.

== History ==
In 1932, the Holy See set up the Roman Catholic Diocese of Hongdong.

In 1958, Hongtong County was selected as one of the two pilot counties for the elimination of religion in China (the other is Pingyang County, Zhejiang). The Catholic church was completely destroyed and the cathedral was demolished. It was rebuilt in 2002 with a Gothic architecture style.
