= Disituan =

Disituan 第四疃镇
- Town
- Dìsìtuăn Zhèn
- Location in Hebei Location in China
- Coordinates: 36°51′39″N 115°00′07″E
- Country: People's Republic of China
- Province: Hebei
- Prefecture-level city: Handan
- County: Quzhou

Area
  - Total: 84.38 km^{2} (32.58 sq mi)

Population (2010)
  - Total: 39,827
  - Density: 472/km^{2} (1,220/sq mi)
- Time zone: UTC+8 (China Standard)

Disituan (Chinese: 第四疃镇; pinyin: Dìsìtuăn Zhèn) is a town located in Quzhou County, Handan, Hebei, China. According to the 2010 census, Disituan had a population of 39,827, including 20,121 males and 19,706 females. The population was distributed as follows: 9,976 people aged under 14, 27,129 people aged between 15 and 64, and 2,722 people aged over 65.

== See also ==
- List of township-level divisions of Hebei
