= Joseph Hou Guoyang =

Joseph Hou Guoyong or Guoyang (1922 – before 2022) was a Chinese Roman Catholic prelate, who served as a Bishop of the Archdiocese of Chongqing since 1989.

== Biography ==
Bishop Hou Guoyong was born in 1922. Little is known regarding his personal details, but he was ordained as a priest in 1951. He was clandestinely consecrated as bishop by clandestine bishop Peter Joseph Fan Xueyan from the Diocese of Baoding on 8 October 1989 in Baoding for the Archdiocese of Chongqing.

In 2022, Catholic Hierarchy updated his profile to clarify that he is deceased, though a precise date or year is not known.

== See also ==
- Catholic Church in Sichuan
