= Stephen Yang Xiangtai =

Chinese Roman Catholic bishop (1923–2021)

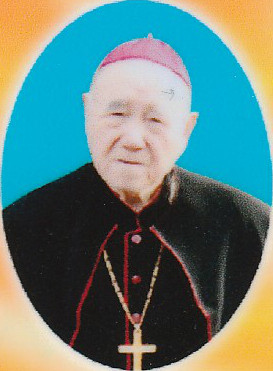
Bishop Stephen Yang Xiangtai

Stephen Yang Xiangtai (Chinese: 楊祥太; 3 January 1923 – 13 October 2021) was a Chinese Roman Catholic prelate, who served as a Bishop Coadjutor (1996–1999) and a Diocesan Bishop (1999–2016) of the Roman Catholic Diocese of Daming (Diocese of Handan by the Chinese government).

== Life ==
Coat of arms of Stephen Yang Xiangtai

Bishop Yang was born in village Gaocun, Hunan in a Catholic family on 3 January 1923 (by the lunar calendar on 17 November 1922). He joined the theological seminary after a school and a minor seminary education and was ordained a priest on 27 August 1949 in Kaifeng. He worked as a parish priest in different locations and in the time of the Cultural Revolution was detained and imprisoned.

On 30 November 1996, he was consecrated as a Coadjutor Bishop by Bishop Peter Chen Bolu and succeeded him after his resignation on 17 September 1999. He served as bishop here until his resignation in 2016. Bishop Yang was recognised by the Chinese government but never joined the Catholic Patriotic Association.

Bishop Yang died on 13 October 2021 at the age of 98 in a hospital in Handan, Hebei, China.
