= Joseph Sun Yuanmo =

Chinese Catholic bishop

- Bishop Emeritus of Hongdong
- Church: Cathedral of Hongtong
- Province: Taiyuan
- Diocese: Diocese of Hongdong
- Installed: 1991
- Term ended: 2006
- Predecessor: Francis Han Tingbi
- Successor: Peter Liu Gen-zhu

Orders
- Ordination: 1948

Personal details
- Born: November 7, 1920 Zhuangyuan, Shanxi
- Died: February 23, 2006 (aged 85) Hongdong, Shanxi
- Denomination: Roman Catholic

Chinese name
- Traditional Chinese: 孫遠謨
- Simplified Chinese: 孙远谟
Transcriptions
Standard Mandarin
- Hanyu Pinyin: Sūn Yuǎnmó

Joseph Sun Yuanmo (Chinese: 孙远谟; November 7, 1920 – February 23, 2006) was a Chinese Catholic priest and Bishop of the Roman Catholic Diocese of Hongdong.

== Biography ==
From the age of 15, Sun was educated in a lower spiritual seminary. He also studied philosophy and theology (including in Beijing). In 1948 he was ordained a priest, and worked as a pastor in Guangxi.

During the Cultural Revolution, he was required to work in the countryside. Later he was in the Roman Catholic Diocese of Hongdong (Shanxi province) as a parish priest, rector of the lower seminary, and spiritual director of nuns. In 1982 he was secretly consecrated by Bishop Francis Han Tingbi and became the auxiliary bishop of Hongdong. In 1991, he was the coadjutor of Bishop Francis Han Tingbi, and after Han death the same year, he took over the duties of the ordinary.

Sun died at the age of 85 after a long illness. He was recognized as a bishop by both the Vatican and the Chinese government.

Catholic Church titles
Previous: Francis Han Tingbi	Bishop of the Roman Catholic Diocese of Hongdong; 1991–2006	Next: Peter Liu Gen-zhu
