= Diocese of Hongdong =

Diocese of the Catholic Church in China

Diocese of Hongdong Dioecesis Homtomensis 天主教洪洞教区
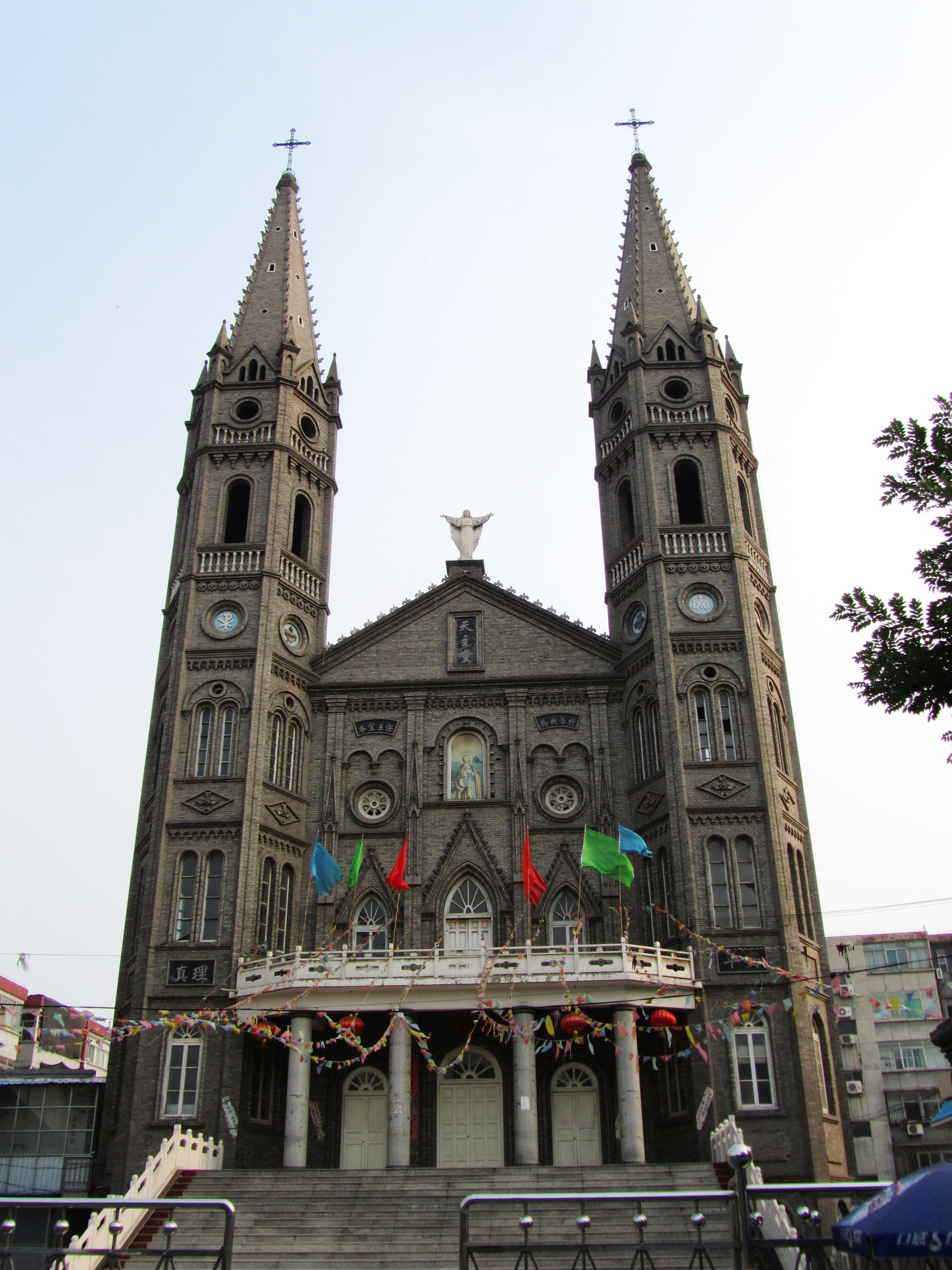
- Cathedral of Hongtong

Location
- Country: China
- Ecclesiastical province: Taiyuan
- Metropolitan: Taiyuan

Information
- Rite: Latin Rite
- Cathedral: Cathedral of Hongtong

Current leadership
- Pope: Leo XIV
- Bishop: Peter Liu Gen-zhu
- Metropolitan Archbishop: Paul Meng Zhuyou

The Roman Catholic Diocese of Hongdong/Hungtung (Latin: Homtomen(sis), Chinese: 洪洞; pinyin: Hóngtóng) is a diocese located in the city of Hongdong in the ecclesiastical province of Taiyuan. It is centered in the Chinese province of Shanxi.

== History ==
- June 17, 1932: Established as Apostolic Prefecture of Hongdong (洪洞) from the Apostolic Vicariate of Luanfu (潞安府)
- April 18, 1950: Promoted as Diocese of Hongdong

== Leadership ==
- Bishops of Hongdong

(Roman rite)

- Bishop Peter Liu Gen-zhu (22 December 2020 – Present)
  - Bishop Joseph Sun Yuanmo (November 7, 1920–February 23, 2006)
  - Bishop Francis Han Tingbi (韓廷弼) (April 18, 1950–December 21, 1991)
- Prefects Apostolic of Hongdong (Roman Rite)
  - Bishop Francis Han Tingbi (韓廷弼) (1949–April 18, 1950)
  - Fr. Joseph Gao Zong-han (Kao) (高宗漢) (1942–November 14, 1944)
  - Fr. Peter Cheng Yu-tang (Tch’eng) (成玉堂) (May 24, 1932–1942)
