= Peter Liu Gen-zhu =

Chinese bishop

Most Reverend Peter Liu Gen-zhu
- Bishop of Hongdong
- Native name: 刘根柱
- Archdiocese: Taiyuan
- Diocese: Hongdong
- Appointed: November 2020
- Predecessor: Joseph Sun Yuanmo
- Successor: "Incumbent"

Orders
- Ordination: 1991
- Consecration: 22 December 2020 by Bishop Paul Meng Ningyou

Personal details
- Born: 12 October 1966 (age 59) Hongtong County, Shanxi, China
- Denomination: Roman Catholic
- Education: Shaanxi Catholic Theological and Philosophical Seminary

Peter Liu Gen-zhu is a Chinese Roman Catholic prelate currently serving as bishop of the Roman Catholic Diocese of Hongdong, China. He is the second bishop ordained with the approval of the Holy See and the Chinese government under the provisional agreement.

== Early life ==
Liu Gen-zhu was born on 12 October 1966 in Hongdong County, Shanxi Province, China. He completed his studies from Shaanxi Catholic Theological and Philosophical Seminary, Shaanxi, China.

== Priesthood ==
Liu and was ordained a priest in 1991. He was appointed vicar general of the Roman Catholic Diocese of Hongdong in June 2010. He has been a member of the 9th Committee of the Patriotic Association of the Chinese Catholic Church. He has also served as the deputy director of the 7th Patriotic Association of Shanxi Province.

== Episcopate ==
Liu Gen-zhu was appointed bishop of the Roman Catholic Diocese of Hongdong and received his episcopal ordination on 22 December 2020. He was consecrated by Bishop Paul Meng Ningyou. His ordination took place at the Catholic church in Hongdong County Square. He succeeded Joseph Sun Yuanmo. The diocese had no bishop since 2006.

Catholic Church titles
Previous: Joseph Sun Yuanmo	Bishop of the Roman Catholic Diocese of Hongdong; 2020–	Next: "Incumbent"
