= Daming County =

Daming County 大名县 Taming
- County
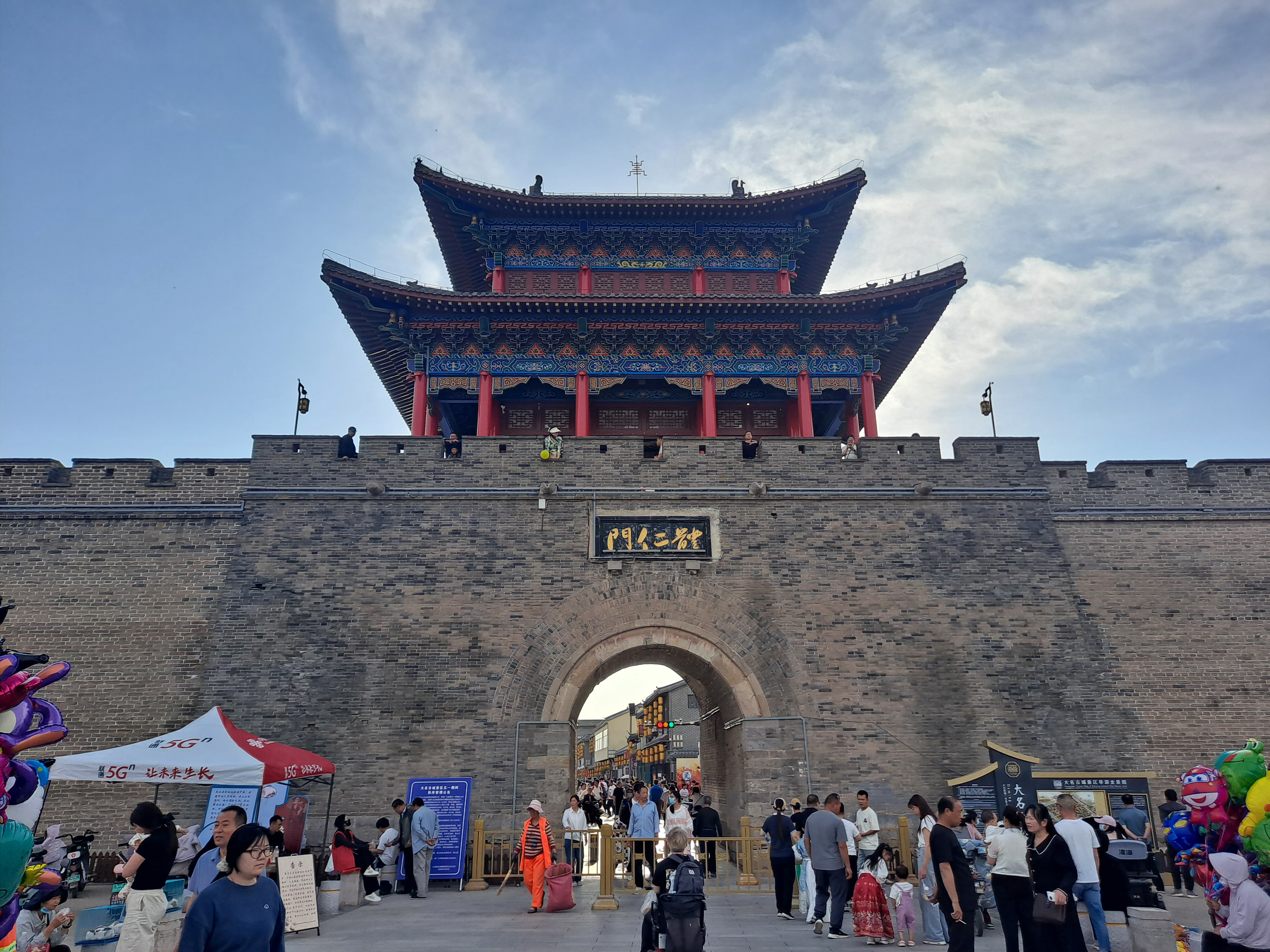
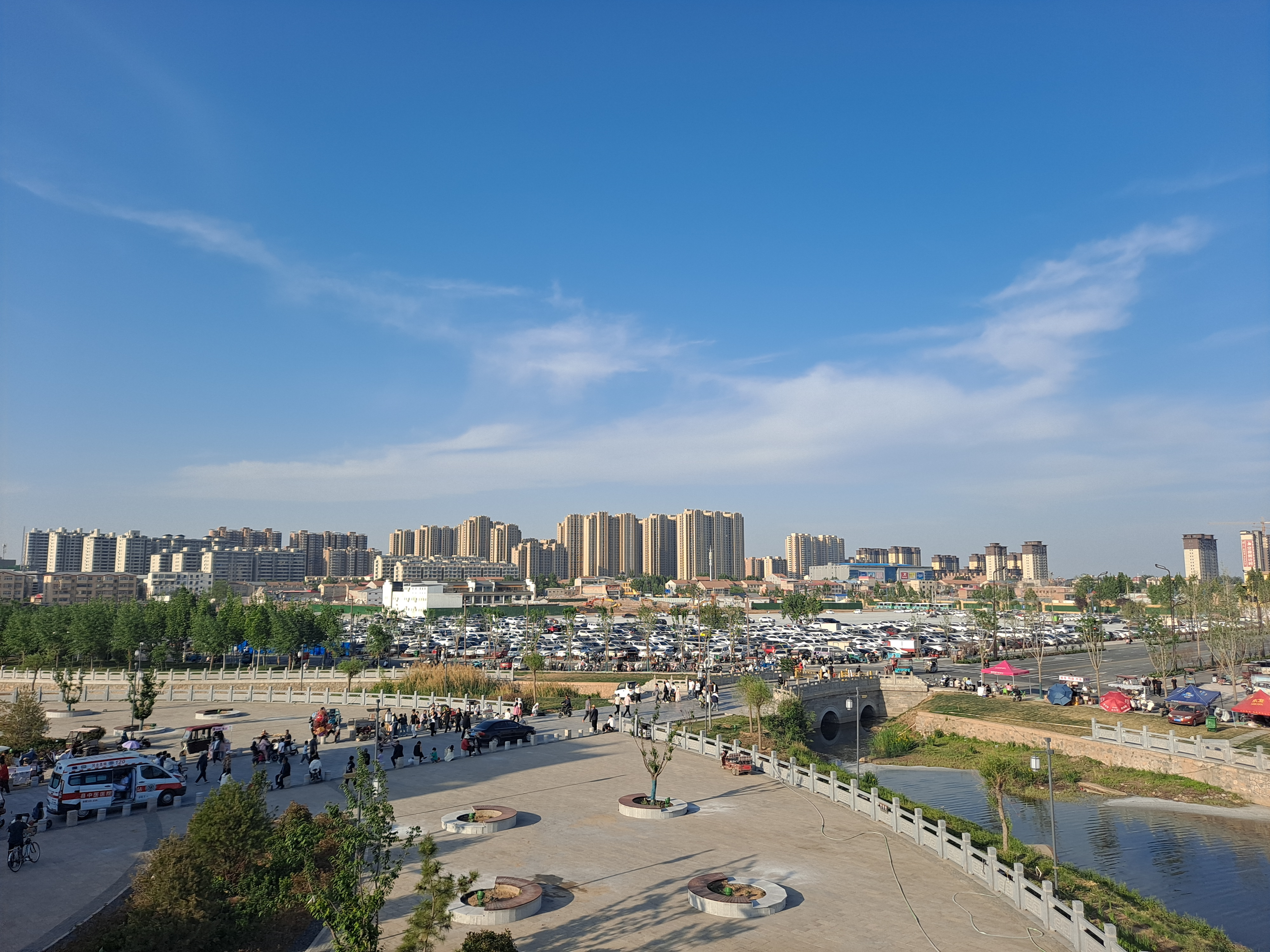
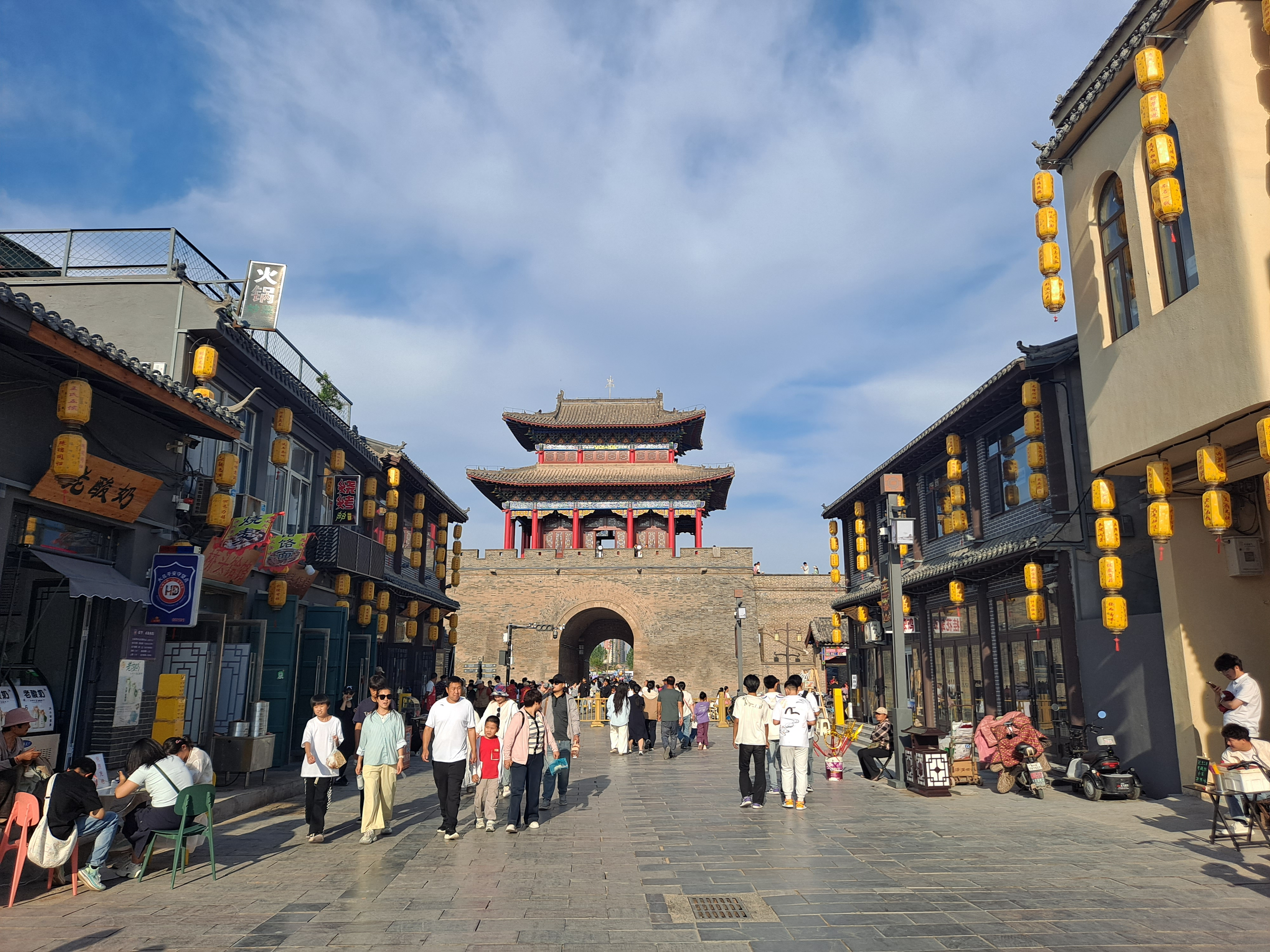
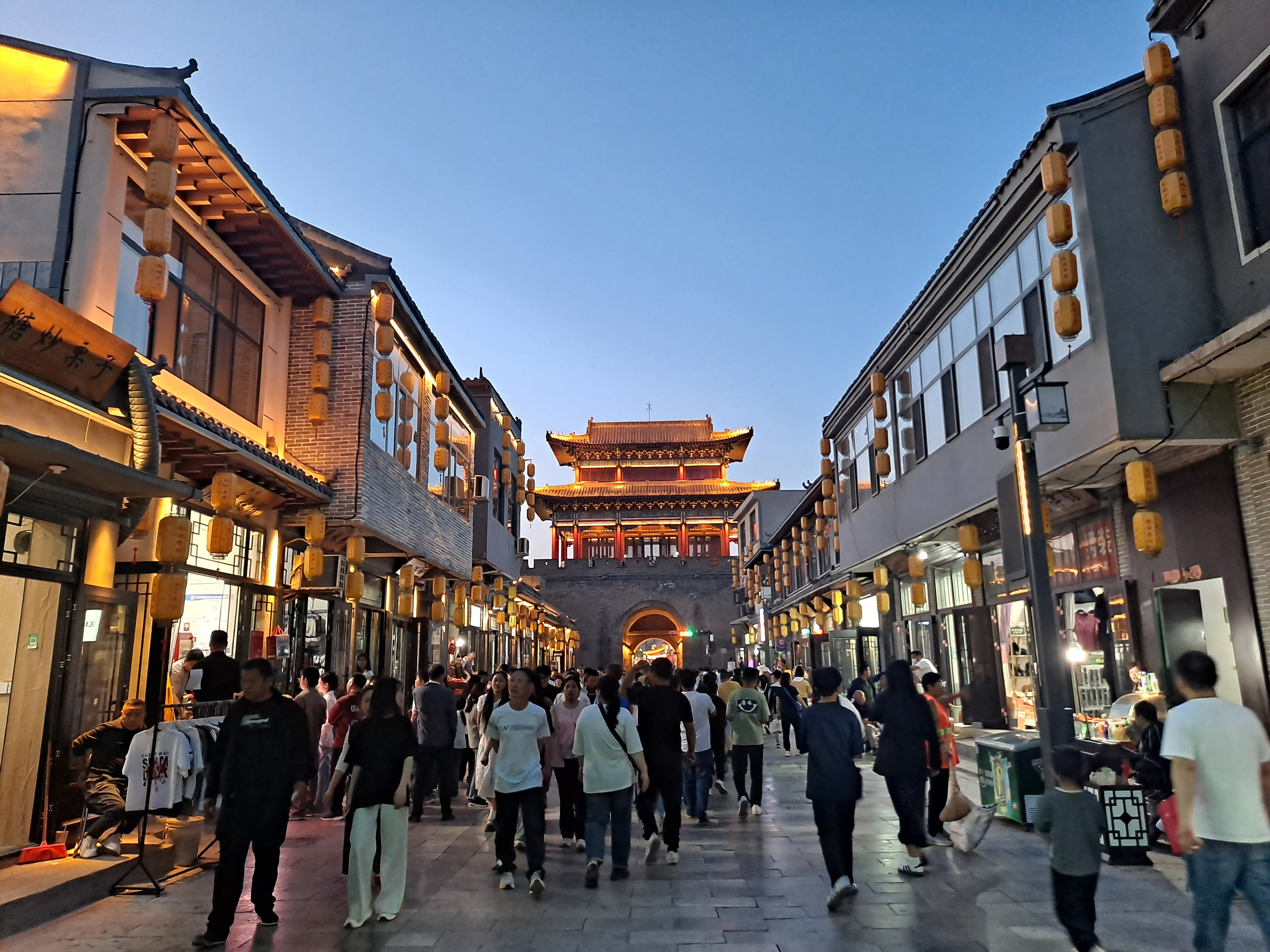
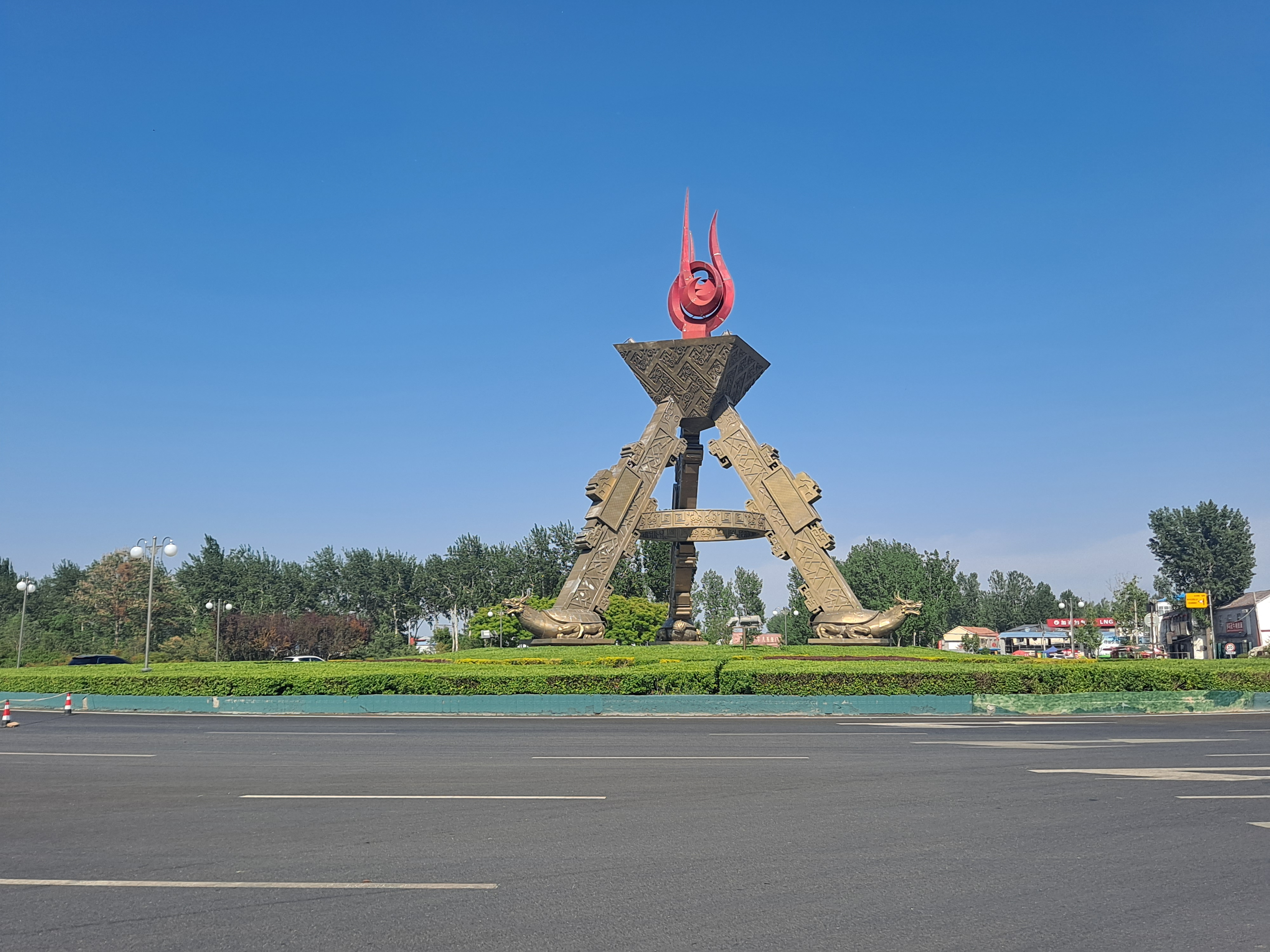
- Daming Ancient City Panoramic view of Daming County from East Gate Daming Ancient City Daming Ancient City Urban landscape of Daming County City walls of Daming

- Location in Hebei
- Coordinates: 36°17′N 115°09′E
- Country: People's Republic of China
- Province: Hebei
- Prefecture-level city: Handan

Area
  - Total: 1,052 km^{2} (406 sq mi)
- Elevation: 47 m (154 ft)

Population (2020 census)
  - Total: 726,396
  - Density: 690.5/km^{2} (1,788/sq mi)
- Time zone: UTC+8 (China Standard)
- Postal code: 056900
- Website: dm.hd.gov.cn

Daming County
- Traditional Chinese: 大名縣
- Simplified Chinese: 大名县
- Literal meaning: Great Name County; Famous County
Transcriptions
Standard Mandarin
- Hanyu Pinyin: Dàmíngxiàn
- Wade–Giles: Ta-ming Hsien

Daming Fu
- Chinese: 大名府
- Literal meaning: Seat of Daming Prefecture
Transcriptions
Standard Mandarin
- Hanyu Pinyin: Dàmíngfǔ
- Wade–Giles: Ta-ming-fu

Daming County is a county under the jurisdiction of Handan City in far southern Hebei Province, China. It was formerly one of the capitals of the Northern Song.

== History ==
Song China

It was formerly known as Beijing under the Northern Song dynasty, who used it as their northern capital. The city served as an important centre for learning during Imperial China. It was renamed to Daming Fu during the Ming Dynasty and stayed unchanged until the Republican era. French Jesuits settled in the city in 1897 and founded a French College (Fawen 法文). A large Gothic church was erected inside the city walls from 1918 to 1921; it became a cathedral in 1935 and is listed as key cultural relic of the People's Republic of China since 2013.

== Administrative divisions ==
Daming County includes 6 towns, 13 townships, and 1 ethnic township.

Towns:

- Daming (大名镇), Yangqiao (杨桥镇), Wanti (万堤镇), Longwangmiao (龙王庙镇), Shuguan (束馆镇), Jintan (金滩镇)

Townships:

- Shageta Township (沙圪塔乡), Wangcun Township (王村乡), Pushang Township (铺上乡), Huangjinti Township (黄金堤乡), Dajie Township (大街乡), Jiuye Township (旧治乡), Ximuzhuang Township (西未庄乡), Sungandian Township (孙甘店乡), Xifuji Township (西付集乡), Niantou Township (埝头乡), Beifeng Township (北峰乡), Zhangji Township (张集乡), Hongmiao Township (红庙乡), Yingzhen Hui Ethnic Township (营镇回族乡)

== Climate ==
Climate data for Daming, elevation 45 m (148 ft), (1991–2020 normals, extremes 1981–present)
Month	Jan	Feb	Mar	Apr	May	Jun	Jul	Aug	Sep	Oct	Nov	Dec	Year
Record high °C (°F)	19.8 (67.6)	24.2 (75.6)	28.1 (82.6)	35.1 (95.2)	38.2 (100.8)	42.5 (108.5)	41.5 (106.7)	36.7 (98.1)	38.0 (100.4)	35.0 (95.0)	27.2 (81.0)	22.4 (72.3)	42.5 (108.5)
Mean daily maximum °C (°F)	4.1 (39.4)	8.4 (47.1)	14.9 (58.8)	21.3 (70.3)	26.9 (80.4)	32.2 (90.0)	32.2 (90.0)	30.6 (87.1)	27.2 (81.0)	21.5 (70.7)	12.7 (54.9)	5.7 (42.3)	19.8 (67.7)
Daily mean °C (°F)	−1.6 (29.1)	2.3 (36.1)	8.5 (47.3)	14.9 (58.8)	20.7 (69.3)	26.0 (78.8)	27.3 (81.1)	25.6 (78.1)	21.0 (69.8)	14.9 (58.8)	6.8 (44.2)	0.2 (32.4)	13.9 (57.0)
Mean daily minimum °C (°F)	−6.1 (21.0)	−2.6 (27.3)	3.0 (37.4)	9.1 (48.4)	14.8 (58.6)	20.2 (68.4)	23.0 (73.4)	21.6 (70.9)	16.2 (61.2)	9.7 (49.5)	2.1 (35.8)	−3.9 (25.0)	8.9 (48.1)
Record low °C (°F)	−19.3 (−2.7)	−14.9 (5.2)	−8.1 (17.4)	−2.3 (27.9)	4.0 (39.2)	10.3 (50.5)	15.8 (60.4)	12.6 (54.7)	5.1 (41.2)	−1.2 (29.8)	−17.9 (−0.2)	−17.1 (1.2)	−19.3 (−2.7)
Average precipitation mm (inches)	4.0 (0.16)	7.4 (0.29)	10.4 (0.41)	28.8 (1.13)	39.1 (1.54)	63.5 (2.50)	142.7 (5.62)	104.9 (4.13)	47.7 (1.88)	27.9 (1.10)	19.4 (0.76)	5.2 (0.20)	501 (19.72)
Average precipitation days (≥ 0.1 mm)	2.0	3.3	3.2	5.1	5.8	7.5	10.9	9.2	6.8	5.2	4.3	2.4	65.7
Average snowy days	2.5	2.6	0.9	0.2	0	0	0	0	0	0	1.0	2.1	9.3
Average relative humidity (%)	64	60	58	64	66	62	78	83	77	69	70	68	68
Mean monthly sunshine hours	138.5	145.7	194.5	210.0	235.9	211.7	176.2	181.1	175.5	172.3	145.1	140.8	2,127.3
Percentage possible sunshine	45	47	52	53	54	48	40	44	48	50	48	47	48
Source: China Meteorological Administration all-time January high

== See also ==
- Other Damings
