= Yongnian, Handan =

Yongnian 永年区 Yungnien
- District
- Location in Hebei
- Coordinates: 36°44′38″N 114°32′38″E
- Country: People's Republic of China
- Province: Hebei
- Prefecture-level city: Handan
- Time zone: UTC+8 (China Standard)
- Postal code: 057150

Yongnian, Handan
- Traditional Chinese: 永年區
- Simplified Chinese: 永年区
- Literal meaning: All Year District; Longevity District
Transcriptions
Standard Mandarin
- Hanyu Pinyin: Yǒngniánqū
- Wade–Giles: Yung-nien Ch‘ü

Former names

Yongnian County
- Traditional Chinese: 永年縣
- Simplified Chinese: 永年县
- Literal meaning: All Year County; Longevity County
Transcriptions
Standard Mandarin
- Hanyu Pinyin: Yǒngniánxiàn
- Wade–Giles: Yung-nien Hsien

Guangping Prefecture
- Traditional Chinese: 廣平府
- Simplified Chinese: 广平府
- Literal meaning: Expansively Pacified Prefecture
Transcriptions
Standard Mandarin
- Hanyu Pinyin: Guǎngpíngfǔ
- Wade–Giles: Kuang-p‘ing Fu

Ming Prefecture
- Chinese: 洺州
- Literal meaning: Ming River Prefecture
Transcriptions
Standard Mandarin
- Hanyu Pinyin: Míngzhōu
- Wade–Giles: Ming Chou

Yongnian is an urban district of the city of Handan, Hebei province, China. It is the seat of the Roman Catholic Diocese of Yongnian.

== History ==
During the Middle Ages, the region was known as Ming Prefecture and administered from Mingzhou, now known as Guangfu. Guangfu continued to serve as the local seat of government when Ming Prefecture first became Guangping Prefecture and then Yongnian County. The area's population was about 220,000 in 1491; 1,225,408 in 1820; 1,101,876 in 1883; and 1,734,036 in 1946.

== Administrative Divisions ==
Towns:

- Linmingguan (临洺关镇), Dabeiwang (大北汪镇), Guangfu (广府镇), Yonghehui (永合会镇), Nanyancun (南沿村镇), Zhangxibao (张西堡镇)

Townships:

- Xiaolongma Township (小龙马乡), Xiaoxibao Township (小西堡乡), Zhengxi Township (正西乡), Dongyangzhuang Township (东杨庄乡), Xiyangcheng Township (西阳城乡), Xisu Township (西苏乡), Xihezhuang Township (西河庄乡), Qumo Township (曲陌乡), Liuhan Township (刘汉乡), Jiangwu Township (讲武乡), Liuying Township (刘营乡), Xinzhuangbao Township (辛庄堡乡), Jiehedian Township (界河店乡), Yaozhai Township (姚寨乡)

== Climate ==
Climate data for Yongnian, elevation 111 m (364 ft), (1991–2020 normals, extremes 1981–2010)
Month	Jan	Feb	Mar	Apr	May	Jun	Jul	Aug	Sep	Oct	Nov	Dec	Year
Record high °C (°F)	18.6 (65.5)	26.3 (79.3)	33.0 (91.4)	36.5 (97.7)	39.0 (102.2)	43.9 (111.0)	42.0 (107.6)	36.9 (98.4)	38.6 (101.5)	33.8 (92.8)	27.9 (82.2)	26.6 (79.9)	43.9 (111.0)
Mean daily maximum °C (°F)	3.9 (39.0)	8.4 (47.1)	15.1 (59.2)	21.6 (70.9)	27.4 (81.3)	32.6 (90.7)	32.3 (90.1)	30.5 (86.9)	27.2 (81.0)	21.3 (70.3)	12.5 (54.5)	5.6 (42.1)	19.9 (67.8)
Daily mean °C (°F)	−1.6 (29.1)	2.2 (36.0)	8.8 (47.8)	15.4 (59.7)	21.4 (70.5)	26.4 (79.5)	27.5 (81.5)	25.7 (78.3)	21.3 (70.3)	15.1 (59.2)	6.7 (44.1)	0.3 (32.5)	14.1 (57.4)
Mean daily minimum °C (°F)	−5.9 (21.4)	−2.6 (27.3)	3.2 (37.8)	9.4 (48.9)	15.4 (59.7)	20.6 (69.1)	23.2 (73.8)	21.8 (71.2)	16.5 (61.7)	10.0 (50.0)	2.1 (35.8)	−3.8 (25.2)	9.2 (48.5)
Record low °C (°F)	−21.5 (−6.7)	−21.6 (−6.9)	−8.7 (16.3)	−2.4 (27.7)	2.0 (35.6)	10.0 (50.0)	15.2 (59.4)	12.0 (53.6)	5.1 (41.2)	−3.0 (26.6)	−17.1 (1.2)	−17.1 (1.2)	−21.6 (−6.9)
Average precipitation mm (inches)	2.8 (0.11)	6.5 (0.26)	9.0 (0.35)	27.5 (1.08)	41.3 (1.63)	53.9 (2.12)	142.9 (5.63)	126.5 (4.98)	47.3 (1.86)	25.7 (1.01)	14.5 (0.57)	3.2 (0.13)	501.1 (19.73)
Average precipitation days (≥ 0.1 mm)	1.8	3.0	2.8	5.3	6.6	8.5	11.5	9.8	7.2	5.5	4.0	2.2	68.2
Average snowy days	3.0	3.0	1.1	0.2	0	0	0	0	0	0	1.4	2.7	11.4
Average relative humidity (%)	60	56	52	58	60	57	74	79	72	65	66	63	64
Mean monthly sunshine hours	132.1	147.4	196.9	220.0	245.9	213.8	181.3	184.8	177.2	174.5	145.6	139.4	2,158.9
Percentage possible sunshine	43	48	53	56	56	49	41	45	48	51	48	47	49
Source: China Meteorological Administration
