= Diocese of Yongnian =

Roman Catholic diocese in China

Coordinates: 36°47′N 114°30′E

Diocese of Yongnian Dioecesis Iomnieninus 天主教永年教区

Location
- Country: China
- Ecclesiastical province: Beijing
- Metropolitan: Beijing

Statistics
- Population: Total; Catholics: 9.43 million; 150000

Information
- Denomination: Catholic Church
- Sui iuris church: Latin Church
- Rite: Roman Rite

Current leadership
- Bishop: Stephen Yang Xiangtai
- Metropolitan Archbishop: Joseph Li Shan
- Coadjutor: Joseph Sun Ji-gen

The Diocese of Yongnian/Weixian (Latin: Iomnienin(us), Chinese: 永年, 魏縣) is a Latin Church ecclesiastical territory or diocese located in the city of Yongnian, China. It is a suffragan diocese in the ecclesiastical province of the metropolitan Archdiocese of Beijing.

The diocese is also named Diocese of Handan/Yongnian (Chinese: 邯郸/永年教区).

== History ==
The Catholic Church in Handan was established as an apostolic prefecture on May 24, 1929, by Pope Pius XI. The diocesan territory covered the counties of Yongnian, Jize, Zhuzhou, Weixian, Chengan, Cixian, Handan, Qinghe, Guangping, Feixiang with the cathedral located at Zhaozhuang of Weixian. It became an apostolic vicariate on March 6, 1933 and was made a diocese on April 11, 1946.

- May 24, 1929: Established as the Apostolic Prefecture of Yongnian 永年 from the Apostolic Vicariate of Xianxian 獻縣
- March 6, 1933: Promoted as Apostolic Vicariate of Yongnian 永年
- April 11, 1946: Promoted as Diocese of Yongnian 永年

The Diocese plans to build a cathedral in Handan, with a total cost of 3.5 million yuan. The construction of the church was approved by the local government in 2013. The church will be designed by the School of Architecture of the Hebei University of Engineering and will be located in the Wulipu Village in the Sucao Township.

Handan/Yongnian is the fastest-growing diocese in Mainland China after the Diocese of Xingtai.

== Leadership ==
- Bishops of Yongnian 永年
  - Coadjutor bishop Joseph Sun Jigen (2011)
  - Bishop Joseph Cui Shou-xun (Tsui Shou-hsün) (崔守恂) (April 11, 1946 – 1953)
- Vicars Apostolic of Yongnian 永年 (Roman Rite)
  - Bishop Joseph Cui Shou-xun (Tsui Shou-hsün) (崔守恂) (March 6, 1933 – April 11, 1946)
- Prefects Apostolic of Yongnian 永年 (Roman Rite)
  - Fr. Joseph Cui Shou-xun (Tsui Shou-hsün) (崔守恂) (later Bishop) (June 1, 1929 – March 6, 1933)

There are 85 priests in the diocese.
