= Quzhou County =

Quzhou County 曲周县
- County
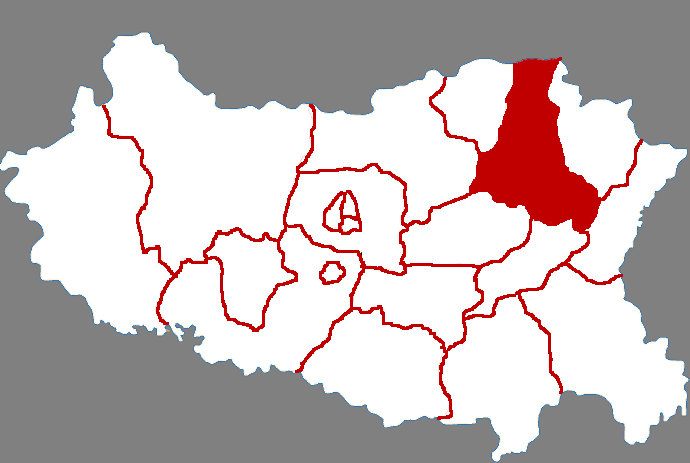
- Quzhou in Handan

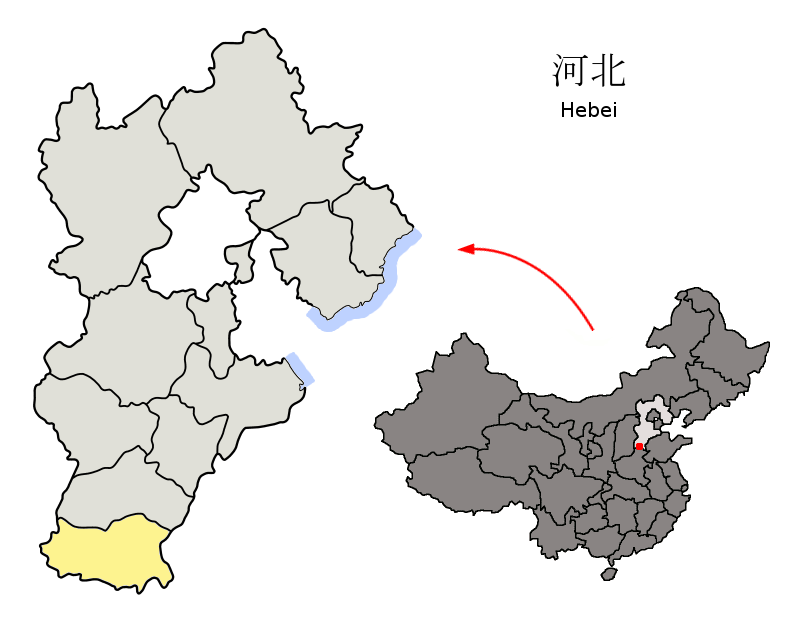
- Handan in Hebei
- Coordinates: 36°46′48″N 114°56′42″E
- Country: People's Republic of China
- Province: Hebei
- Prefecture-level city: Handan

Area
  - Total: 667 km^{2} (258 sq mi)
- Elevation: 42 m (138 ft)

Population
  - Total: 400,000
  - Density: 600/km^{2} (1,600/sq mi)
- Time zone: UTC+8 (China Standard)
- Postal code: 057250

Quzhou County
- Traditional Chinese: 曲周縣
- Simplified Chinese: 曲周县
Transcriptions
Standard Mandarin
- Hanyu Pinyin: Qǔzhōuxiàn
- Wade–Giles: Ch‘ü-chou Hsien

Quzhou (Note: In addition to the pinyin and Wade-Giles romanizations given above, Quzhou sometimes appears in older works as Ku Chou.) is a county under the administration of the prefecture-level city of Handan, in the south of Hebei Province, China. It means "where the river bends". It has a population of 400,000 residing in an area of 667 km^{2} (258 sq mi). This is the hometown of Lu Zhenfei, a politician of the Ming Dynasty.

== Administrative divisions ==
There are 5 towns and 5 townships under the county's administration.

Towns:

- Quzhou (曲周镇), Anzhai (安寨镇), Henantuan (河南疃镇), Houcun (侯村镇), Disituan (第四疃镇)

Townships:

- Dahedao Township (大河道乡), Baizhai Township (白寨乡), Yizhuang Township (依庄乡), Nanliyue Township (南里岳乡), Huaiqiao Township (槐桥乡)

== Climate ==
Climate data for Quzhou, elevation 38 m (125 ft), (1991–2020 normals, extremes 1981–2010)
Month	Jan	Feb	Mar	Apr	May	Jun	Jul	Aug	Sep	Oct	Nov	Dec	Year
Record high °C (°F)	18.6 (65.5)	24.7 (76.5)	30.6 (87.1)	35.0 (95.0)	38.6 (101.5)	42.6 (108.7)	41.3 (106.3)	37.8 (100.0)	38.7 (101.7)	32.5 (90.5)	27.3 (81.1)	25.2 (77.4)	42.6 (108.7)
Mean daily maximum °C (°F)	3.9 (39.0)	8.4 (47.1)	15.1 (59.2)	21.8 (71.2)	27.5 (81.5)	32.4 (90.3)	32.4 (90.3)	30.7 (87.3)	27.2 (81.0)	21.4 (70.5)	12.5 (54.5)	5.5 (41.9)	19.9 (67.8)
Daily mean °C (°F)	−1.6 (29.1)	2.3 (36.1)	8.7 (47.7)	15.4 (59.7)	21.2 (70.2)	26.2 (79.2)	27.5 (81.5)	25.8 (78.4)	21.2 (70.2)	15.0 (59.0)	6.6 (43.9)	0.2 (32.4)	14.0 (57.3)
Mean daily minimum °C (°F)	−6.0 (21.2)	−2.6 (27.3)	3.2 (37.8)	9.6 (49.3)	15.2 (59.4)	20.5 (68.9)	23.2 (73.8)	21.9 (71.4)	16.4 (61.5)	9.8 (49.6)	1.9 (35.4)	−3.9 (25.0)	9.1 (48.4)
Record low °C (°F)	−21.4 (−6.5)	−15.8 (3.6)	−8.6 (16.5)	−1.0 (30.2)	2.9 (37.2)	10.2 (50.4)	16.3 (61.3)	13.3 (55.9)	4.1 (39.4)	−2.8 (27.0)	−15.7 (3.7)	−17.4 (0.7)	−21.4 (−6.5)
Average precipitation mm (inches)	2.6 (0.10)	7.1 (0.28)	8.9 (0.35)	29.6 (1.17)	40.9 (1.61)	58.0 (2.28)	126.3 (4.97)	105.3 (4.15)	46.3 (1.82)	26.2 (1.03)	15.3 (0.60)	3.8 (0.15)	470.3 (18.51)
Average precipitation days (≥ 0.1 mm)	1.7	2.9	2.6	5.2	6.4	7.9	10.3	8.9	6.9	5.0	3.6	2.3	63.7
Average snowy days	2.4	2.6	0.9	0.2	0	0	0	0	0	0	0.9	2.4	9.4
Average relative humidity (%)	60	56	53	59	62	60	76	80	74	67	68	65	65
Mean monthly sunshine hours	123.3	140.1	189.9	217.0	240.8	214.6	183.1	186.3	176.5	166.2	135.3	126.7	2,099.8
Percentage possible sunshine	40	45	51	55	55	49	41	45	48	48	45	43	47
Source: China Meteorological Administration
