= 1980 Handan murders =

Shooting and grenade attack in Hebei, China

- Location: Handan, Hebei, China
- Date: 17 November 1980 – 18 November 1980 c. 21:00 – c. 3:00 (CST)
- Attack type: Mass shooting, grenade attack
- Weapons: Light machine gun Rifles; Pistol; Hand grenades
- Deaths: 7
- Injuries: 12
- Perpetrator: Wang Xiwen

On the night of 17 November 1980, a mass shooting and grenade attack took place in Handan, Hebei, China. Seven people were killed and twelve others were injured before the perpetrator, 32-year-old police officer Wang Xiwen, was arrested.

Wang was sentenced to death in May 1981 and executed a month later.

== Shooting ==
In the evening of 17 November 1980, Wang entered the North Sucao police station in Congtai district. Inside, he broke into the office of deputy director Song Tiefa (宋铁法) and director Li Qingsheng (李庆生), where he pried open a drawer and stole a pistol, 25 rounds of ammunition, ¥200, and ration stamps worth 300 jin of grain. Wang fired eleven gunshots inside the office, destroying a ceramics bust of Mao Zedong, a television set, as well as portraits of Mao, Karl Marx, Friedrich Engels, Vladimir Lenin, Joseph Stalin, Zhou Enlai, and Zhu De. Upon exiting the police station, Wang fired gunshots at passersby on the street to intimidate them, injuring two people. He then unsuccessfully attempted to gain entrance to the home of Criminal Investigation Squad captain Wang Denghai (王登海) to obtain another pistol.

Wang fled the initial scene by climbing a fence into the courtyard of the Hexi production brigade headquarters, where he broke into the armory of the second brigade in the north of Handan, where he stole a light machine gun, four or eight rifles, 28 hand grenades, and a total of 2,700 rounds of ammunition, which he placed into the yard of the building. For the next six hours, he ran through the streets firing the rifles and throwing grenades indiscriminately, occasionally entering houses to attack residents. Wang periodically returned to the armory in between to restock his arms supply. During this time, Wang also damaged another television set and a transformer. Wang was arrested in the early morning by police with the aid of civilian helpers. In total, 460 rounds were fired and 26 grenades were detonated.

=== Casualties ===
Six people were dead at the scene while another died at the hospital. Twelve others were injured, five of them seriously. Additionally, two pigs were killed.

- Li Liuzhu (李留柱), captain of Sucao second brigade
- Guo Huimin (郭会民), temporary cooperative worker
- Lu Yingkui (路英奎), miner
- Guo Qingxuan (郭清选), member of Sucao second brigade
- Li Fushan (李付善), factory worker
- Hu Peihua (户培花), factory worker
- Du Xinmen (杜新民), power plant worker, died at a hospital

== Perpetrator ==
Wang Xiwen (Chinese: 王锡文) was a member of the Handan municipal public security sub-bureau, serving as an officer for Sucao township. He had most recently been promoted to brigade militia company commander and vice chairman of the brigade revolutionary committee. Wang was said to have become resentful when he lost the latter position, because he and his wife Hao Jinfang (郝金芳) did not adhere to the one-child policy.

Wang, who was also a member of the Chinese Communist Party (CCP), was a follower of Lin Biao and the Gang of Four, advocated their policies and criticized the leaders of the CCP after the third plenary session of the 11th Central Committee of the Chinese Communist Party in 1978. The trial of the Gang of Four was set to commence a few days before the attack.

== Investigation ==
After the investigation of the crime by the Handan City Public Security Bureau was completed the case was transferred to the Handan Prefectural Intermediate People's Court on 13 January 1981. Prosecution began on January 21, but due to insufficient evidence the case was returned to the Handan Procuratorate on February 20.

After an additional investigation, the case was again transferred to the Handan Prefectural Intermediate People's Court on 26 March, and on 9 April, 1981, Wang was convicted of counter-revolutionary murder (a form of premeditated homicide in tandem with counter-revolutionary activities). On 13 April, he was given a death sentence. Wang filed an appeal against the verdict, claiming that he had been insane at the time, and so the case was transferred to the Hebei Provincial Higher People's Court on 21 April which sent Wang to a psychiatric hospital in Baoding for examination, where he was eventually found to be legally sane. On 9 May, the judicial committee decided to maintain Wang's conviction, and on 13 May, the case was transferred to the Supreme People's Court to review the verdict, which was approved on 26 May.

=== Execution ===
In the morning hours of 10 June, Wang's conviction was upheld by the Handan Prefectural Intermediate People's Court, as well as the Handan Municipal People's Court in a public trial at the Handan Municipal Stadium. Immediately after his appeal was dismissed Wang was blindfolded, bound to a pole and executed by a firing squad in front of a crowd of 50,000 people.
