= Handan County =

Former county of Handan City

Handan County 邯郸县
- County of the People's Republic of China
- 2016
Succeeded by
Congtai District; Hanshan District
- Today part of: Part of Congtai District & Hanshan District, Handan, Hebei

Handan
- Traditional Chinese: 邯鄲
- Simplified Chinese: 邯郸
- Postal: Hantan
Transcriptions
Standard Mandarin
- Hanyu Pinyin: Hándān
- Wade–Giles: Han^{2}-tan^{1}

Handan County (Chinese: 邯郸县) was a county of Hebei, China, under the administration of the prefecture-level city of the same name. In 2016, it was abolished as Congtai District and Hanshan District.

== Administrative divisions ==
Towns:

- Hucun (户村镇), Beizhangzhuang (北张庄镇), Shangbi (尚璧镇), Heshazhen (河沙镇镇), Huangliangmeng (黄粱梦镇)

Townships:

- Sanling Township (三陵乡), Daizhao Township (代召乡), Nanlügu Township (南吕固乡), Nanbao Township (南堡乡), Jianzhuang Township (兼庄乡), Kangzhuang Township (康庄乡)
