= Fengfeng (disambiguation) =

Fengfeng may refer to:

- Fengfeng Mining District, a district in Handan, Hebei, China
  - Fengfeng Town, a town in Fengfeng Mining District
- Fengfeng Subdistrict (冯封街道), a subdistrict in Zhongzhan District, Jiaozuo, Henan, China

== See also ==
- Feng Feng (disambiguation) for people
