= Diqiu Township =

Diqiu Township 狄邱乡
- Rural Township
- Díqiū Xiāng
- Location in Hebei Location in China
- Coordinates: 36°17′17″N 114°34′48″E
- Country: People's Republic of China
- Province: Hebei
- Prefecture-level city: Handan
- County: Linzhang

Area
  - Total: 36.68 km^{2} (14.16 sq mi)

Population (2010)
  - Total: 28,702
  - Density: 782.5/km^{2} (2,027/sq mi)
- Time zone: UTC+8 (China Standard)

Diqiu Township (Chinese: 狄邱乡; pinyin: Díqiū Xiāng) is a rural township located in Linzhang County, Handan, Hebei, China. According to the 2010 census, Diqiu Township had a population of 28,702, including 14,012 males and 14,690 females. The population was distributed as follows: 7,122 people aged under 14, 19,641 people aged between 15 and 64, and 1,939 people aged over 65.

== See also ==
- List of township-level divisions of Hebei
