= Renmin Road Subdistrict, Handan =

Renmin Road Subdistrict 人民路街道
- Subdistrict
- Location in Hebei
- Coordinates: 36.60992°N 114.49346°E
- Country: China
- Province: Hebei
- Prefecture-level city: Handan
- District: Congtai District
- Time zone: UTC+8 (China Standard Time)

Renmin Road Subdistrict (Chinese: 人民路街道; pinyin: Rénmínlù Jiēdào) is a subdistrict situated in Congtai District, Handan, Hebei, China. As of 2020, it administers the following five residential neighborhoods:

- Kuangjian Community (矿建社区)
- Shejiyuan Community (设计院社区)
- Liming Street Community (黎明街社区)
- Guangming Community (光明社区)
- Hepingbei Community (和平北社区)

== See also ==
- List of township-level divisions of Hebei
