= Dashe =

Dashe 大社镇
- Town
- Dàshè Zhèn
- Location in Hebei Location in China
- Coordinates: 36°32′58″N 114°14′04″E
- Country: People's Republic of China
- Province: Hebei
- Prefecture-level city: Handan
- District: Fengfengkuang

Area
  - Total: 43.66 km^{2} (16.86 sq mi)

Population (2010)
  - Total: 47,674
- Time zone: UTC+8 (China Standard)

Dashe (Chinese: 大社镇; pinyin: Dàshè Zhèn) is a town located in Fengfengkuang District, Handan, Hebei, China. According to the 2010 census, Dashe had a population of 47,674, including 25,933 males and 21,741 females. The population was distributed as follows: 6,732 people aged under 14, 36,207 people aged between 15 and 64, and 4,735 people aged over 65.

== See also ==
- List of township-level divisions of Hebei
