= Daizhao Township =

Daizhao Township 代召乡
- Rural Township
- Dàizhào Xiāng
- Location in Hebei Location in China
- Coordinates: 36°35′09″N 114°35′53″E
- Country: People's Republic of China
- Province: Hebei
- Prefecture-level city: Handan
- District: Hanshan

Area
  - Total: 40.70 km^{2} (15.71 sq mi)

Population (2010)
  - Total: 34,210
  - Density: 840.6/km^{2} (2,177/sq mi)
- Time zone: UTC+8 (China Standard)

Daizhao Township (Chinese: 代召乡; pinyin: Dàizhào Xiāng) is a rural township located in Hanshan District, Handan, Hebei, China. According to the 2010 census, Daizhao Township had a population of 34,210, including 17,145 males and 17,065 females. The population was distributed as follows: 8,292 people aged under 14, 23,693 people aged between 15 and 64, and 2,225 people aged over 65.

== See also ==
- List of township-level divisions of Hebei
