= Xiangtangshan Caves =

Archaeological site in Handan, China

Coordinates: 36.53295°N 114.15928°E

The Xiangtangshan Caves (simplified Chinese: 响堂山石窟; traditional Chinese: 響堂山石窟; pinyin: Xiǎngtángshān Shíkū; lit. 'Mountain of the Echoing Halls Caves') is a group of Buddhist cave temples located in the Fengfeng Mining District about 20 km southwest of the City of Handan, in Hebei province, China. The oldest cave temples in the group date to the Northern Qi, one of the Northern dynasties in the sixth century, and were sponsored by the dynasty's court. The caves are located about 20 km to the northwest of the site of Ye, the capital of the Northern Qi and were carved into dense limestone cliffs on mountains that are part of the Taihang Mountains.

== Description and background ==
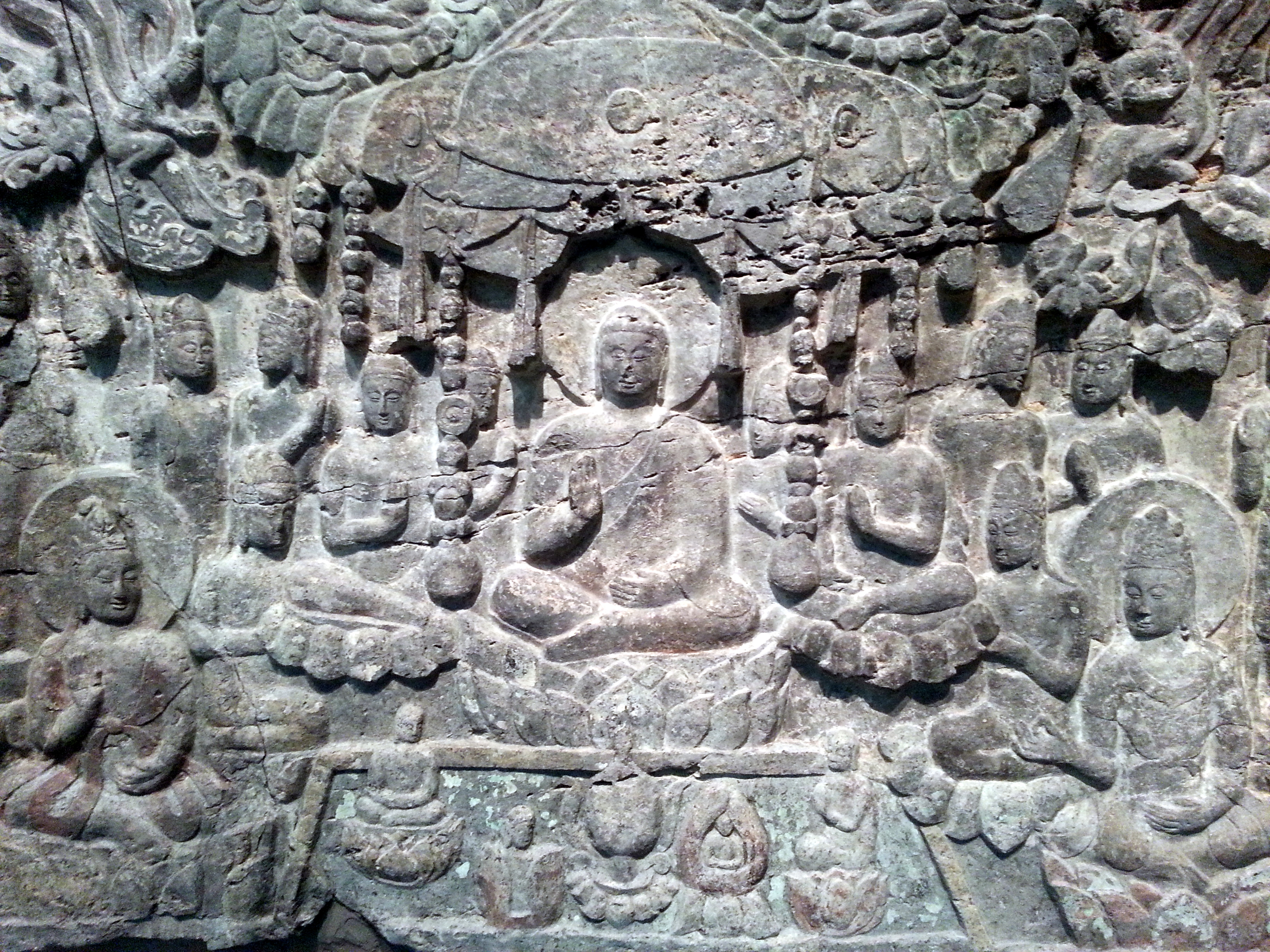
Relief depicting the western paradise of the Amitabha buddha from Cave 2 of the Xiangtangshan Caves.

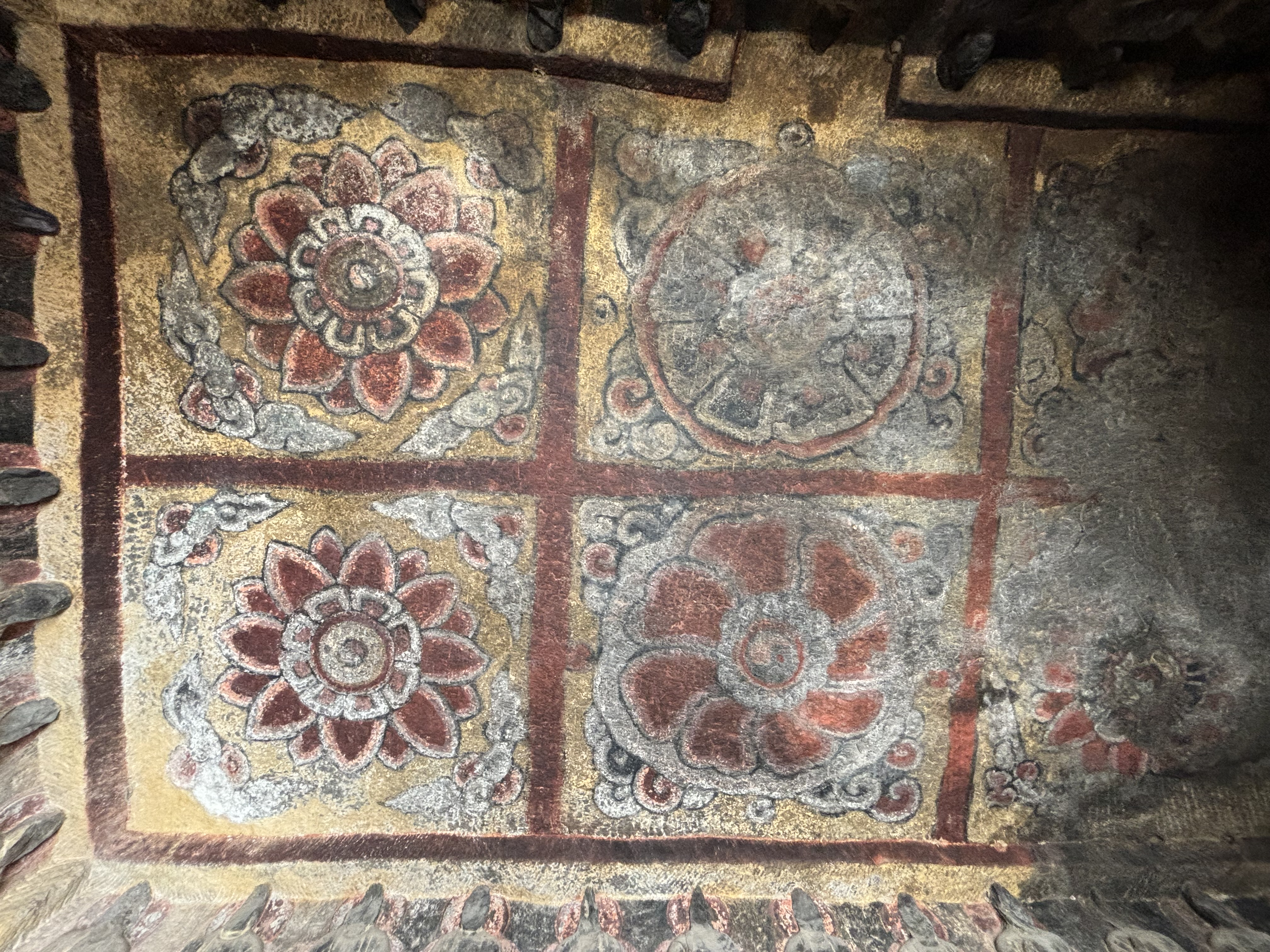

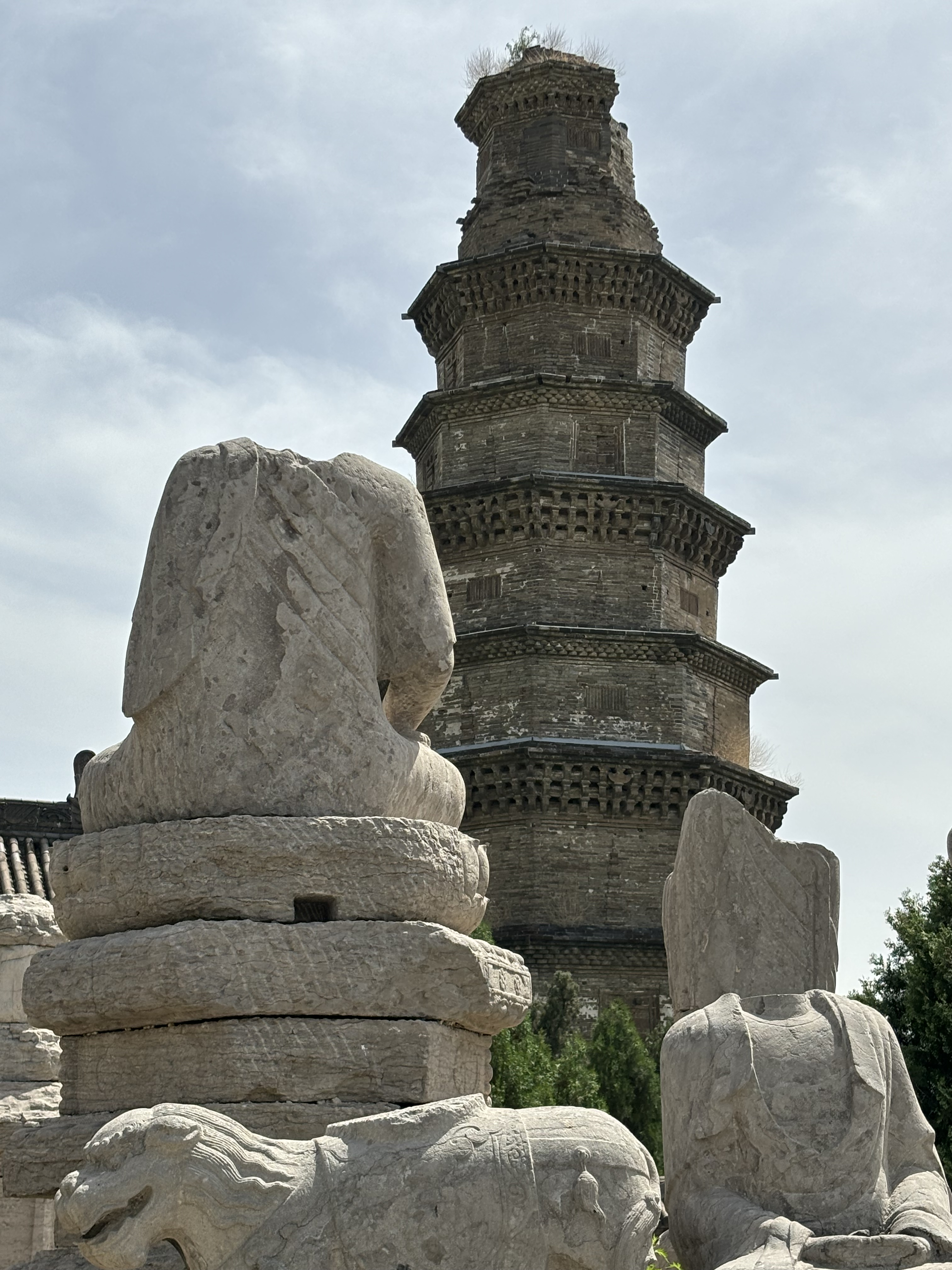

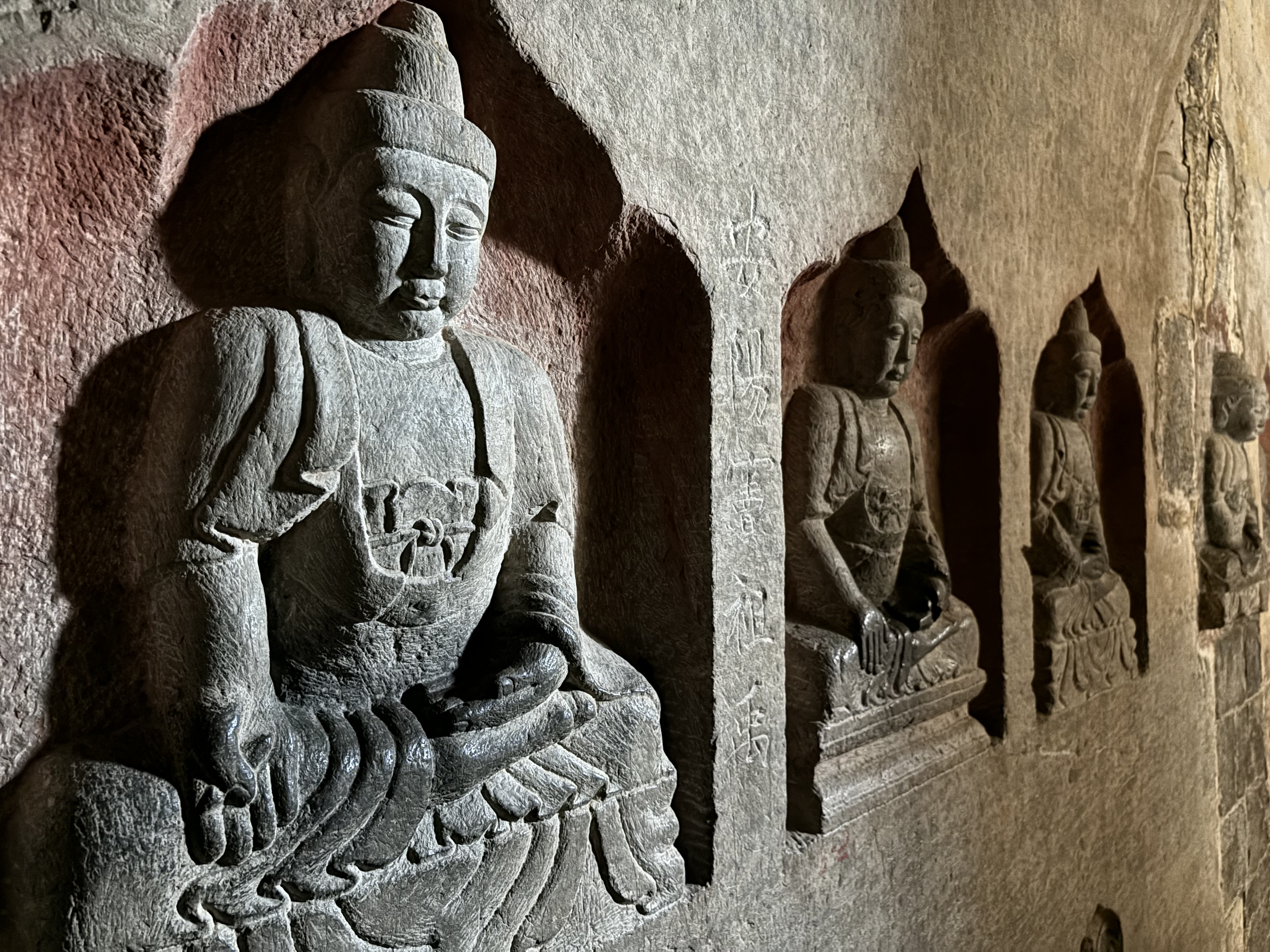

There are a total of 36 caves, clustered in three groups: a northern group (Chinese: 北响堂山; pinyin: Běi Xiǎngtángshān) on Mount Gu (Chinese: 鼓山; pinyin: Gǔshān; lit. 'Drum Mountain') near the village of Hecun; a southern group (Chinese: 南响堂山; pinyin: Nán Xiǎngtángshān) on Mount Fu; and a site at Shuiyusi that is also known as "Little Xiangtangshan" (Chinese: 小响堂山; pinyin: Xiǎo Xiǎngtángshān).

The northern group contains three main caves, the northern cave (cave 7), the central cave (cave 4), and the southern cave (cave 2). According to one historical source, writings by the monk Min Fen, the northern cave group was commissioned by Wen Xuan, the first Northern Qi emperor. The largest cave in the group (the northern cave or cave 7) contains an elevated empty niche atop its central pillar that historical sources and scholars identify as the imperial burial chamber of Gao Yang or his father, Gao Huan. Recent art historical research has reconstructed a group of seven freestanding limestone monster caryatid panels (shenwang), now dispersed across international collections, as the decorative stone base for a memorial stupa originally placed inside this elevated niche.. Construction of the caves in the southern group started at the initiative of a monk, Hui Yi of the Linghua temple, in 565. The project was continued under the sponsorship of Gao Anahong, the king of Huai Ying and one of the highest official in the Northern Qi dynasty. Work on the southern caves likely ended around the time when the Northern Qi was annexed by the Northern Zhou in 577. Since they were not sponsored by imperial patrons, the caves in the southern group tend to be smaller than those in the northern group.

Many of the sculpture pieces from the sites were removed and sold internationally as early as 1909. A number were sold to the American collector Charles Freer by the art dealer C.T. Loo, who is suspected of arranging for their removal from China without permission. Many are now in the The Metropolitan Museum of Art, Freer Gallery, Cleveland Museum of Art, Denver Art Museum, University of Pennsylvania Museum of Archaeology and Anthropology, Victoria and Albert Museum, Harvard University Art Museums, Miho Museum, Osaka Municipal Museum of Art, Rietberg Museum, Palace Museum Beijing, and Nelson-Atkins Museum of Art To address this dispersal, the Center for the Art of East Asia at the University of Chicago conducted a multi-year research project using 3D scanning and archival photography to digitally match dispersed sculptures to their original cave locations, culminating in the major research monograph and traveling exhibition Echoes of the Past: The Buddhist Cave Temples of Xiangtangshan. Building upon this digital preservation, Harvard University's Chinese Art Media Lab (CAMLab) developed an immersive multimedia exhibition, The Caves of Echoing Chambers, to virtually reimagine the site's original architectural and sculptural context. The caves are designated as a Major Historical and Cultural Site Protected at the National Level (designation 1-40). The caves are designated as a Major Historical and Cultural Site Protected at the National Level (designation 1-40). (Chinese regulations and Western museum practices now promote protection of such cultural treasures.) The caves are a Major Historical and Cultural Site Protected at the National Level (designation 1-40).

=== Dispersed sculptures in museum collections ===
During the widespread looting of Chinese Buddhist sites in the early 20th century, dozens of freestanding statues, monumental heads, and architectural relief panels were chiseled from Xiangtangshan and entered international public and private collections. Major institutions holding documented pieces from Xiangtangshan include:

- Metropolitan Museum of Art (New York): Holds several Northern Qi stone sculptures and architectural fragments from Xiangtangshan, including standing Bodhisattva figures.
- Cleveland Museum of Art (Cleveland): Houses an architectural monster caryatid panel carved in high relief (Accession No. 1957.357), attributed to the North Cave.
- Nelson-Atkins Museum of Art (Kansas City, Missouri): Houses a high-relief limestone sculpture of an Atlantean winged monster caryatid (Accession No. 40-16), which originally served as a supportive architectural pillar base within the complex.
- Penn Museum (Philadelphia): Holds monumental stone heads and seated Buddhist figures removed from the cave complex.
- Harvard Art Museums (Cambridge, Massachusetts): Preserves relief carvings, heads, and architectural elements from the complex.
- Victoria and Albert Museum (London): Holds a monumental limestone Buddha head from the South Cave (Cave 2), among other Northern Qi sculptural works.
- National Museum of Asian Art (Freer Gallery of Art / Arthur M. Sackler Gallery, Washington, D.C.): Houses one of the largest Western repositories of Xiangtangshan artifacts, including the celebrated Western Paradise relief panel from South Cave 2.
- Miho Museum (Shiga, Japan): Preserves freestanding Northern Qi limestone Bodhisattva statues originating from the complex.
- Tsz Shan Monastery Buddhist Art Museum (Hong Kong): Preserves fragmented limestone carvings attributed to Xiangtangshan, including a sculptural relief of a disciple's clasped hands.
