= Baiheji Township =

Baiheji Township 柏鹤集乡
- Rural Township
- Bǎihèjí Xiāng
- Location in Hebei Location in China
- Coordinates: 36°17′38″N 114°41′01″E
- Country: People's Republic of China
- Province: Hebei
- Prefecture-level city: Handan
- County: Linzhang

Area
  - Total: 50.61 km^{2} (19.54 sq mi)

Population (2010)
  - Total: 38,238
  - Density: 755.5/km^{2} (1,957/sq mi)
- Time zone: UTC+8 (China Standard)

Baiheji Township (Chinese: 柏鹤集乡; pinyin: Bǎihèjí Xiāng) is a rural township located in Linzhang County, Handan, Hebei, China. According to the 2010 census, Baiheji Township had a population of 38,238, including 18,091 males and 20,147 females. The population was distributed as follows: 9,446 people aged under 14, 25,843 people aged between 15 and 64, and 2,949 people aged over 65.

== See also ==
- List of township-level divisions of Hebei
