= Ducunji Township =

Ducunji Township 杜村集乡
- Rural Township
- Dùcūnjí Xiāng
- Location in Hebei Location in China
- Coordinates: 36°16′14″N 114°30′47″E
- Country: People's Republic of China
- Province: Hebei
- Prefecture-level city: Handan
- County: Linzhang

Area
  - Total: 59.38 km^{2} (22.93 sq mi)

Population (2010)
  - Total: 44,830
  - Density: 754.9/km^{2} (1,955/sq mi)
- Time zone: UTC+8 (China Standard)

Ducunji Township (Chinese: 杜村集乡; pinyin: Dùcūnjí Xiāng) is a rural township located in Linzhang County, Handan, Hebei, China. According to the 2010 census, Ducunji Township had a population of 44,830, including 21,700 males and 23,130 females. The population was distributed as follows: 11,067 people aged under 14, 30,487 people aged between 15 and 64, and 3,276 people aged over 65.

== See also ==
- List of township-level divisions of Hebei
