= Feng Jianming =

Feng Jianming (born October 1963; simplified Chinese: 冯建明; traditional Chinese: 馮建明; pinyin: Féng Jiànmíng; his English name: Jim; his Gaelic name: Séamus, birthplace: Handan City, Hebei Province) is a Chinese literature professor.

He completed his post-doctoral program in Fudan University with a major in Comparative Literature and World Literature, finished his doctoral program in Shanghai International Studies University with a major in English Language and Literature, and got his master's degree of English Language and Literature in Hebei Normal University. Now, he is a professor of English, the director of the Centre for Irish Studies, and a supervisor of postgraduate students at Shanghai Institute of Foreign Trade. His research areas focus on Irish literature, British and American literature, and the Bible as literature. His recent publications include academic books on James Joyce and critical essays on Irish literature. He keeps a diary entitled Ming Ze Zhu (Writing as a Part of Jim's Life).

== Academic books ==
2010: Characterization in Joyce's Novels. Beijing: People's Literature Publishing House, 2010.

2008: The Character in British Fiction: A Critical History (as one of the compilers). Shanghai: Shanghai Foreign Language Education Press, 2008.

2007: The English-Chinese Dictionary (Second Edition, as one of the compilers). Shanghai: Shanghai Translation Publishing House, 2007.

2005: The Transfigurations of the Characters in Joyce's Novels. Beijing: Foreign Languages Press, 2005.

2005: Complete Works of Xiao Qian (as one of the members of the editorial board). Wuhan: Hubei People's Publishing House, 2005.

== Critical essays published in Chinese core journals or the source journals of CSSCI ==
2011: “Good Beginnings and Narration.” Masterpieces Review Mid January (2011).

2010: “You, Him, & Me in the Dream.” Literature of the Times Late September (2010).

2010: “Brothers as Persecutors in Finnegans Wake.” Writer Magazine First Half of August (2010).

2010: “The ‘4’ and the History.” Mountain Flowers B7(2010).

2010: “‘Day’ and ‘Night’ in Joyce's Novels.” GuiZhuo Social Sciences 5(2010):36—38.

2010: “Form and Content.” Literature of the Times Early April (2010):79—81.

2010: “Transfiguration and Sublimation.” Masterpieces Review 3 (2010):131—133.

2009: “From Prosaicness to Magicness: on the Artistic Conception of the Ending of A Portrait of the Artist as a Young Man.” English and American Literary Studies. Autumn (2009):167—176.

2008: “Joyce’s Solicitude for Rationality.” Journal of Chongqing University (Social Science Edition) 2 (2008):113—116.

2007: “Artistic Conception of the Beginning of A Portrait of the Artist as a Young Man by Joyce.” Journal of Ningxia University (Humanities & Social Sciences Edition) 4 (2007):68—71.

2004: “On the Feminine ‘Yes’ in Ulysses.” Journal of Hebei Normal University (Philosophy and Social Sciences Edition) 6 (2004): 96–101.

2004: “Wonderful Poetical Features in Finnegans Wake.” Foreign Literature Studies 3 (2004): 36–42.

== Awards ==
2004: Baosteel Education Award (Outstanding [Doctoral] Student Award) awarded by Baosteel Education Fund Council.

2003: The TRIPLE-A STUDENT of Shanghai International Studies University issued by Shanghai International Studies University.
