= Hucun =

Hucun may refer to the following locations in China:

- Hucun, Fujian (湖村镇), town in Ninghua County
- Hucun, Hebei (户村镇), town in Handan County
- Hucun, Shanxi (胡村镇), town in Taigu County
