= Linzhang County =

Linzhang County 临漳县 Linchang
- County
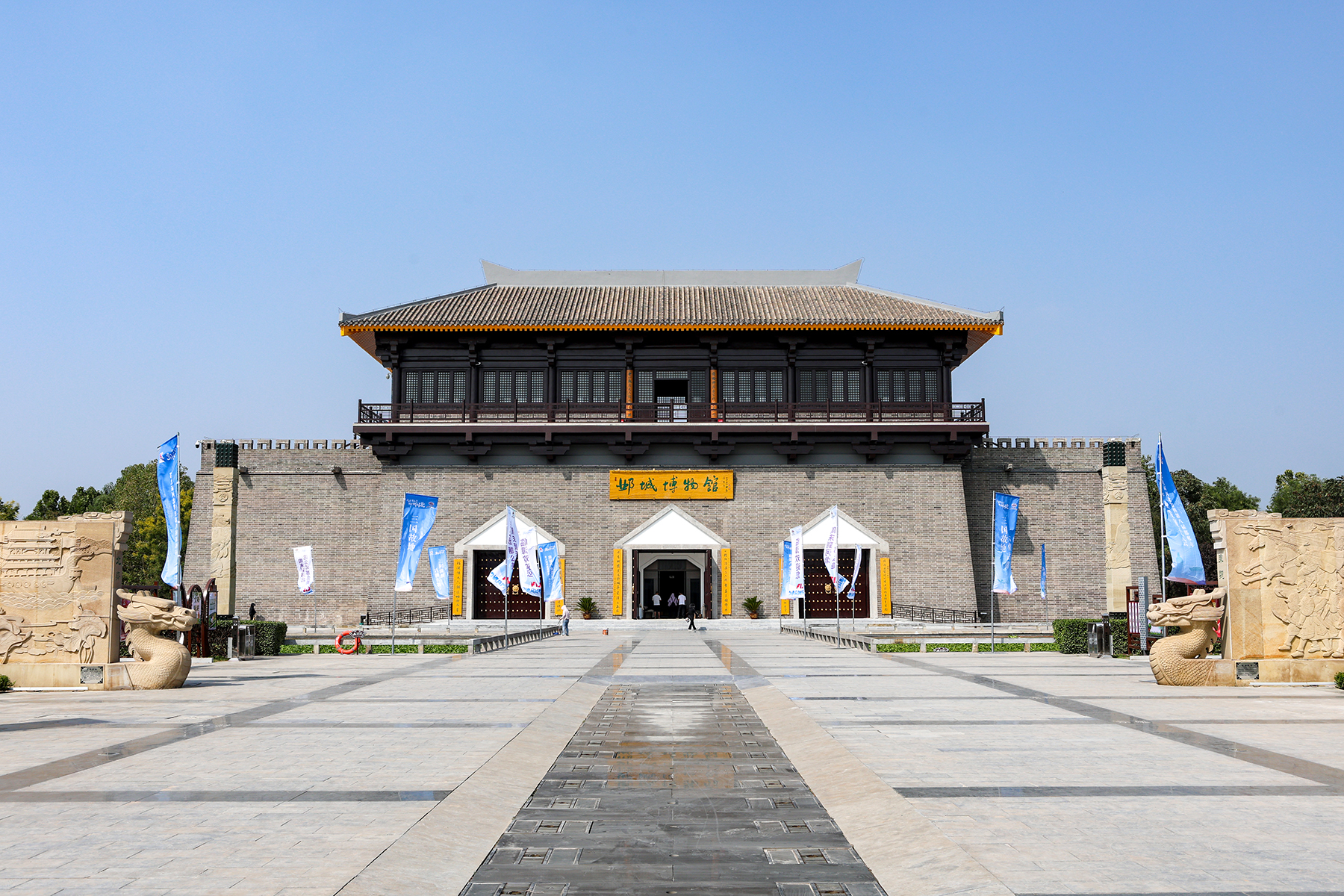
- Yecheng Museum

- Location of the seat in Hebei
- Coordinates: 36°20′N 114°37′E
- Country: People's Republic of China
- Province: Hebei
- Prefecture-level city: Handan
- County seat: Linzhang Town (临漳镇)

Area
  - Total: 744 km^{2} (287 sq mi)
- Elevation: 66 m (217 ft)

Population (2004)
  - Total: 590,000
  - Density: 790/km^{2} (2,100/sq mi)
- Time zone: UTC+8 (China Standard)
- Postal code: 056600

Linzhang County (simplified Chinese: 临漳县; traditional Chinese: 臨漳縣; pinyin: Línzhāng Xiàn) is a county of southmost Hebei province, China, named after the Zhang River within its borders. Linzhang was called Yecheng (Capital of Cao Wei and other state powers) in ancient times. It is under the administration of Handan City, and, as of 2004, it had a population of 590,000 residing in an area of 744 km^{2} (287 sq mi).

== Administrative divisions ==
There are 14 township-level administrative divisions, including 5 towns and 9 townships under the county's administration. The area was formerly part of Henan Province.

Towns:

- Linzhang (临漳镇), Nandongfang (南东坊镇), Suntaoji (孙陶集镇), Liuyuan (柳园镇), Chenggouji (称勾集镇)

Townships:

- Diqiu Township (狄邱乡), Zhangcunji Township (张村集乡), Xiyanggao Township (西羊羔乡), Xiangcaiying Township (香菜营乡), Ducunji Township (杜村集乡), Zhangliji Township (章里集乡), Xiwen Township (习文乡), Zhuanzhaiying Township (砖寨营乡), Baiheji Township (柏鹤集乡)

== Climate ==
Climate data for Linzhang, elevation 66 m (217 ft), (1991–2020 normals, extremes 1981–present)
Month	Jan	Feb	Mar	Apr	May	Jun	Jul	Aug	Sep	Oct	Nov	Dec	Year
Record high °C (°F)	20.2 (68.4)	25.0 (77.0)	28.7 (83.7)	34.7 (94.5)	38.8 (101.8)	43.6 (110.5)	40.3 (104.5)	36.4 (97.5)	37.9 (100.2)	34.5 (94.1)	27.5 (81.5)	24.8 (76.6)	43.6 (110.5)
Mean daily maximum °C (°F)	4.1 (39.4)	8.4 (47.1)	15.6 (60.1)	21.5 (70.7)	27.2 (81.0)	32.3 (90.1)	31.9 (89.4)	30.3 (86.5)	26.9 (80.4)	21.5 (70.7)	13.0 (55.4)	5.8 (42.4)	19.9 (67.8)
Daily mean °C (°F)	−1.3 (29.7)	2.4 (36.3)	9.2 (48.6)	15.3 (59.5)	21.1 (70.0)	26.0 (78.8)	27.0 (80.6)	25.6 (78.1)	21.0 (69.8)	14.9 (58.8)	6.9 (44.4)	0.1 (32.2)	14.0 (57.2)
Mean daily minimum °C (°F)	−5.5 (22.1)	−2.1 (28.2)	3.7 (38.7)	9.6 (49.3)	15.5 (59.9)	20.4 (68.7)	23.1 (73.6)	21.9 (71.4)	16.5 (61.7)	9.9 (49.8)	2.2 (36.0)	−4.0 (24.8)	9.3 (48.7)
Record low °C (°F)	−16.7 (1.9)	−15.2 (4.6)	−8.2 (17.2)	−1.0 (30.2)	4.7 (40.5)	10.8 (51.4)	14.7 (58.5)	12.2 (54.0)	5.0 (41.0)	−2.1 (28.2)	−17.1 (1.2)	−17.0 (1.4)	−17.1 (1.2)
Average precipitation mm (inches)	3.7 (0.15)	7.0 (0.28)	10.1 (0.40)	29.7 (1.17)	39.4 (1.55)	64.2 (2.53)	150.4 (5.92)	102.3 (4.03)	51.2 (2.02)	29.3 (1.15)	16.8 (0.66)	4.3 (0.17)	508.4 (20.03)
Average precipitation days (≥ 0.1 mm)	2.2	3.0	3.0	5.5	6.1	7.8	10.7	9.2	6.8	5.3	4.0	2.4	66
Average snowy days	2.6	2.9	0.9	0.2	0	0	0	0	0	0	1.2	2.5	10.3
Average relative humidity (%)	61	57	55	61	64	62	77	81	75	68	69	65	66
Mean monthly sunshine hours	156.8	162.0	209.5	230.5	256.0	235.3	203.5	207.6	186.1	188.9	162.1	153.3	2,351.6
Percentage possible sunshine	50	52	56	58	58	54	46	50	51	55	53	51	53
Source: China Meteorological Administration all-time January high
