= Feng Feng =

Feng Feng is the name of:

- Fung Fung (1916–2000), Hong Kong actor
- Feng Feng (footballer) (born 1968), Chinese footballer and team manager
- Feng Feng (rower) (born 1971), Chinese rower

== See also ==
- Fengfeng (disambiguation) for places
