= Sucao Township =

Sucao Township 苏曹乡
- Township
- Interactive map of Sucao Township
- Coordinates: 36°38′07″N 114°30′38″E
- Country: People's Republic of China
- Province: Hebei
- Prefecture-level city: Handan
- District: Congtai
- Elevation: 55 m (180 ft)
- Time zone: UTC+8 (China Standard)

Sucao Township (simplified Chinese: 苏曹乡; traditional Chinese: 蘇曹鄉; pinyin: Sūcáo Xiāng) is a township in Congtai District, Handan, Hebei, China.

== Administration ==
As of 2011, the townships has six residential communities (社区) under its administration:

- Hedong (河东社区)
- Hexi (河西社区)
- Nansucao (南苏曹社区)
- Wulipu (五里铺社区)
- Shilipu (十里铺社区)
- Liu'erzhuang (刘二庄社区)
