= Fengfeng Town =

Fengfeng Town 峰峰镇
- Town
- Fēngfēng Zhèn
- Location in Hebei Location in China
- Coordinates: 36°28′20″N 114°12′31″E
- Country: People's Republic of China
- Province: Hebei
- Prefecture-level city: Handan
- District: Fengfengkuang

Area
  - Total: 42.45 km^{2} (16.39 sq mi)

Population (2010)
  - Total: 81,631
- Time zone: UTC+8 (China Standard)

Fengfeng Town (Chinese: 峰峰镇; pinyin: Fēngfēng Zhèn) is a town located in Fengfengkuang District, Handan, Hebei, China. According to the 2010 census, Fengfeng Town had a population of 81,631, including 40,719 males and 40,912 females. The population was distributed as follows: 9,847 people aged under 14, 63,285 people aged between 15 and 64, and 8,499 people aged over 65.

== See also ==
- List of township-level divisions of Hebei
