= Shanghai Foreign Language Education Press =

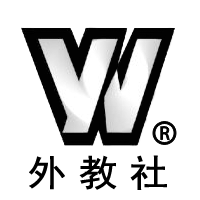
- Founded: December, 1979
- Country of origin: People's Republic of China
- Headquarters location: 558 West Dalian Road, Shanghai, China
- Key people: Zhuang Zhixiang（庄智象）
- Publication types: Books, Dictionaries, Journals, Corpus linguistics, Electronic publications
- Imprints: SFLEP
- No. of employees: 200
- Official website: www.sflep.com

Shanghai Foreign Language Education Press (SFLEP) is a large university press in China. With an affiliate to Shanghai International Studies University, it was founded in December 1979. The press has published over 6,000 titles with a diversity of 30 languages, including course-books, academic works, reference books, dictionaries, journals and electronic publications.

== Imprints and series ==
=== Course books ===
- College English series
- New Century College English Series
- New Century Textbooks for Spanish Major Series
- New Century Textbooks for French Major Series
- New Century Textbooks for German Major Series
- New Century Textbooks for Japanese Major Series
- New Century Textbooks for English Major Series
- New Century Textbooks for Russian Major Series
- New Century Textbooks for Arabic Major Series
- New Century Textbooks for Business English Major Series
- SFLEP Textbooks for Bachelor of Translation and Interpreting (BTI) Series
- SFLEP Textbooks for Master of Translation and Interpreting (MTI) Series
- A Course in English-Chinese Translation
- A New English Course Series
- Postgraduate English Series
- Textbooks for Foreign Language School Series
- Longman Side by Side (import)

=== Dictionaries ===
- Большой Китайско-Русский Словарь (SFLEP Chinese-Russian Dictionary)
- The New Oxford English-Chinese Dictionary
- SFLEP Foreign Language-Chinese Dictionary Series
- New Time English-English English-Chinese Dictionary
- The New Century Multi-functional English-Chinese Dictionary
- A Dictionary of CET-4 Vocabulary Usage
- Concise Oxford English Dictionary with Chinese Translation
- Longman Active Study English-Chinese Dictionary
- Collins COBUILD English-Chinese Learner's Dictionary
- Collins Foreign Language-Chinese Dictionary Series
- SFLEP Foreign Language-Chinese Military Dictionary Series
- Britannica Concise Encyclopedia (import)
- 広辞苑（Japanese Dictionary）(import)

=== Journals ===
- Journal of Foreign Languages
- Foreign Language World
- Foreign Language Testing and Teaching

== Organizational structure ==
- Office of administration
- Finance
- Editorial department
  - Office of the editorial department
    - Senior editor's office
    - Library
  - Higher English education
  - Elementary English education
  - Academic publishing
  - Chinese language and culture
  - Various foreign languages
  - Dictionaries
  - Rights and licenses
  - Copy editing
  - Proofreading
  - Periodicals
  - Cover and format design
  - Digital publishing center
    - SFLEP Information Technology Co., Ltd.
- Publishing center
  - Production
  - SFLEP printing house
  - Shanghai Baoqi bindery plant
  - Shanghai Shenya Industrial Co., Ltd.
  - Shanghai Shenya Publishing Development Co.

- Marketing and sales center
  - Marketing and sales for textbooks
  - Marketing and sales for general books
  - Corporate operations
  - Warehousing and transportation
  - Shanghai SFLEP Sales and Distribution Co, Ltd.
    - SFLEP bookstore
    - Shanghai Shennan foreign language bookstore
  - Jiangsu SFLEP Sales and Distribution Co., Ltd.
  - Hunan SFLEP Sales and Distribution Co., Ltd.
  - Hubei SFLEP Sales and Distribution Co., Ltd.
  - Fujian SFLEP Sales and Distribution Co., Ltd.
  - Shanxi SFLEP Sales and Distribution Co., Ltd.
  - Shandong SFLEP Sales and Distribution Co., Ltd.
- Marketing
- Shanghai SFLEP education and training center
- SFLEP Beijing culture center
- SFLEP North America branch
- SFLEP Research Institute of Publication
- SFLEP Research Institute of Publishing Development

== International cooperation ==
The Shanghai Foreign Language Education Press has established and maintained business relationship with over 60 publishing companies in the United States, the United Kingdom, Germany, France, Russia, Spain, Italy, the Netherlands, Denmark, Korea and Japan. Listed below are some of the publishers among the 60-odd:

- Japan ALC Press Inc
- Japan ASK Co. Ltd
- United Kingdom British Library
- United Kingdom Cambridge University Press
- United Kingdom Cengage Learning
- United States Continuum International Publishing Group
- Germany Cornelsen Verlag
- South Korea Darakwon
- Italy DeAgostini Scuola
- United States Disney Publishing Worldwide, Inc.
- United Kingdom Edinburgh University Press
- Netherlands Elsevier
- United States Encyclopædia Britannica, INC.
- United Kingdom Express Publishing
- Japan Gakken
- Norway Gyldendal
- France Hachette Livre
- United States HarperCollins Publishers
- Japan Iwanami Shoten, Publishers
- United States John Benjamins Publishing Company
- Japan Kabushiki-gaisha Sanseidō

- Germany Klett International
- France Larousse
- United States Lerner Publishing Group
- United Kingdom Macmillan Education
- Singapore Marshall Cavendish
- United States McGraw-Hill Education
- United States Modern Language Association of America
- United Kingdom Multilingual Matters Ltd.
- United Kingdom Oxford University Press
- United States Pearson Education
- United States Random House
- United States Sage Publications
- United Kingdom St. Jerome Publishing
- Japan Shogakukan
- Germany Springer-Verlag
- France Taylor & Francis Group
- United States Teacher Created Materials Publishing
- United States Townsend Press
- Italy Ulrico Hoepli Editore
- United States World Trade Press
- Russia Zlatoust Publishing House

== See also ==
- Shanghai International Studies University
