= Hanshan, Handan =

Hanshan 邯山区
- District
- Location in Hebei
- Coordinates: 36°36′00″N 114°29′02″E
- Country: People's Republic of China
- Province: Hebei
- Prefecture-level city: Handan
- Township-level divisions: 10 subdistricts 2 towns 1 township

Area
  - Total: 427.7 km^{2} (165.1 sq mi)
- Elevation: 62 m (203 ft)

Population (2020 census)
  - Total: 837,419
  - Density: 1,958/km^{2} (5,071/sq mi)
- Time zone: UTC+8 (China Standard)
- Website: hsq.hd.gov.cn

Hanshan (Chinese: 邯山; pinyin: Hánshān) is a district of the city of Handan, Hebei, People's Republic of China.

== Administrative divisions ==
Hanshan administers 10 subdistricts, 2 towns, and 1 township.

Subdistricts:

- Huomo Subdistrict (火磨街道), Lingyuan Road Subdistrict (陵园路街道), Guangming Road Subdistrict (光明路街道), Fudong Subdistrict (滏东街道), Luochengtou Subdistrict (罗城头街道), Zhuhe Road Subdistrict (渚河路街道), Yuxinnan Subdistrict (浴新南街道), Nonglin Road Subdistrict (农林路街道), Maodong Subdistrict (贸东街道), Maoxi Subdistrict (贸西街道)

Towns:

- Matou (马头镇), Beizhangzhuang (北张庄镇)

The only township is Mazhuang Township (马庄乡)
