= Congtai, Handan =

Congtai 丛台区
- District
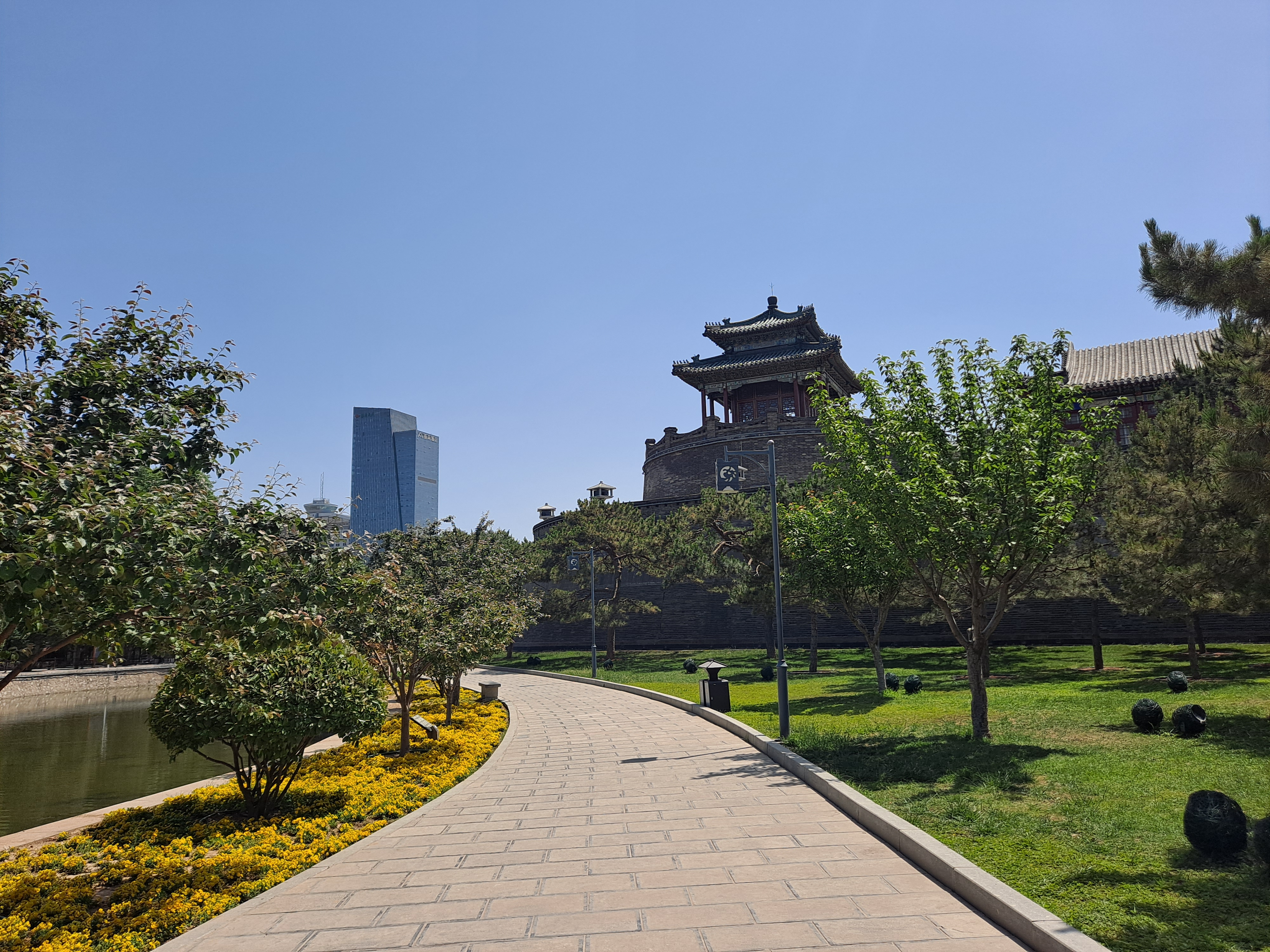
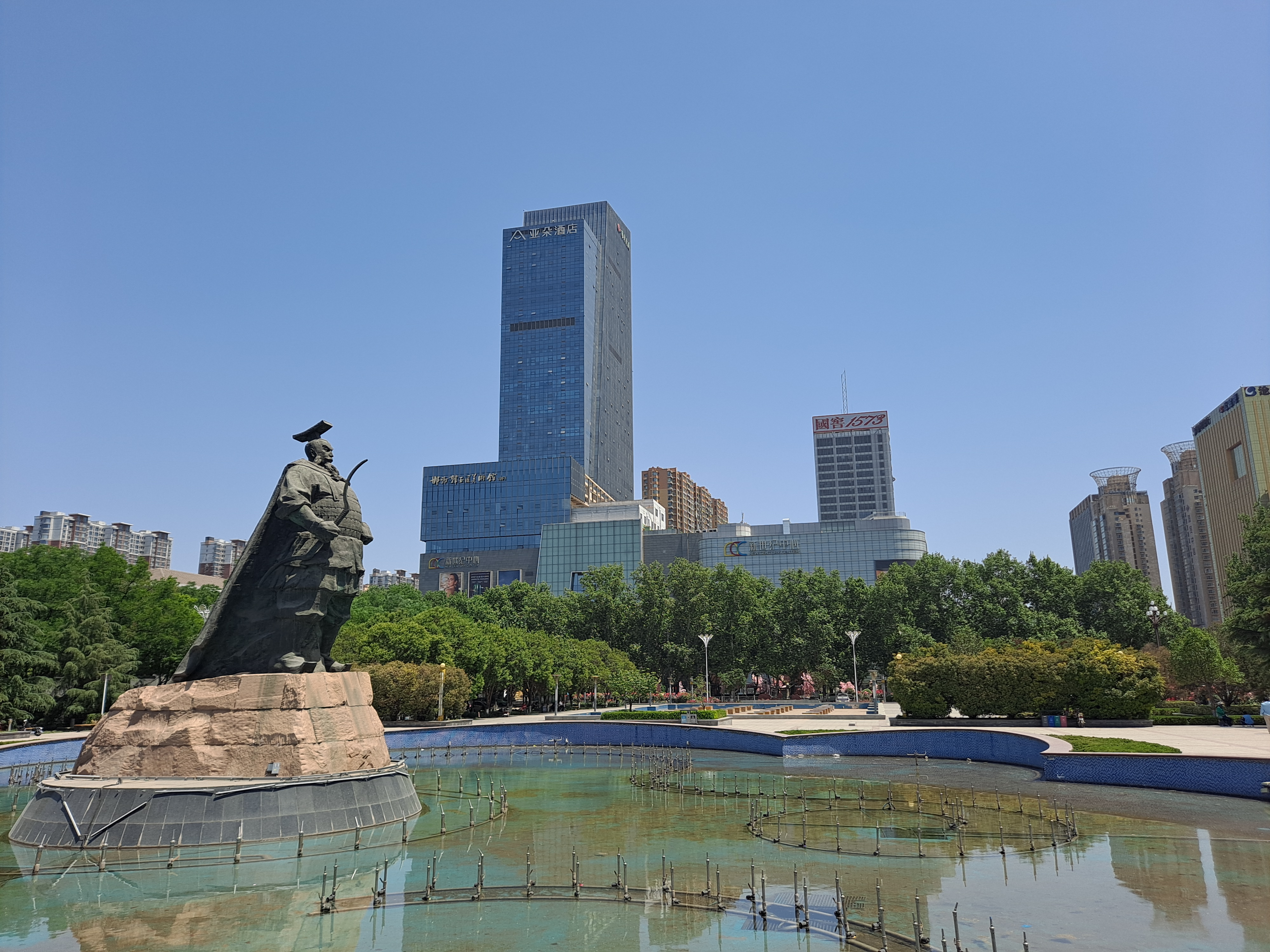
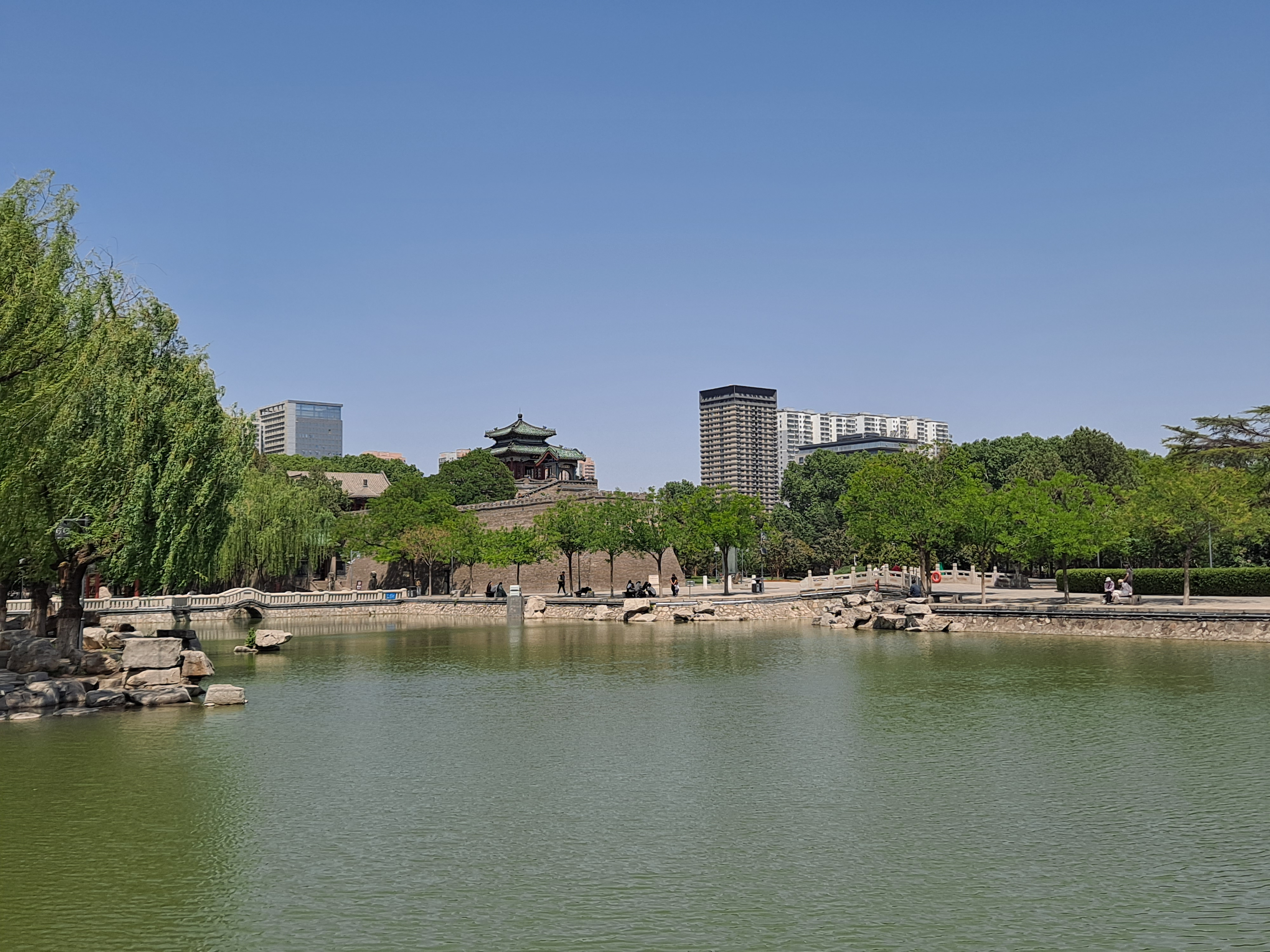
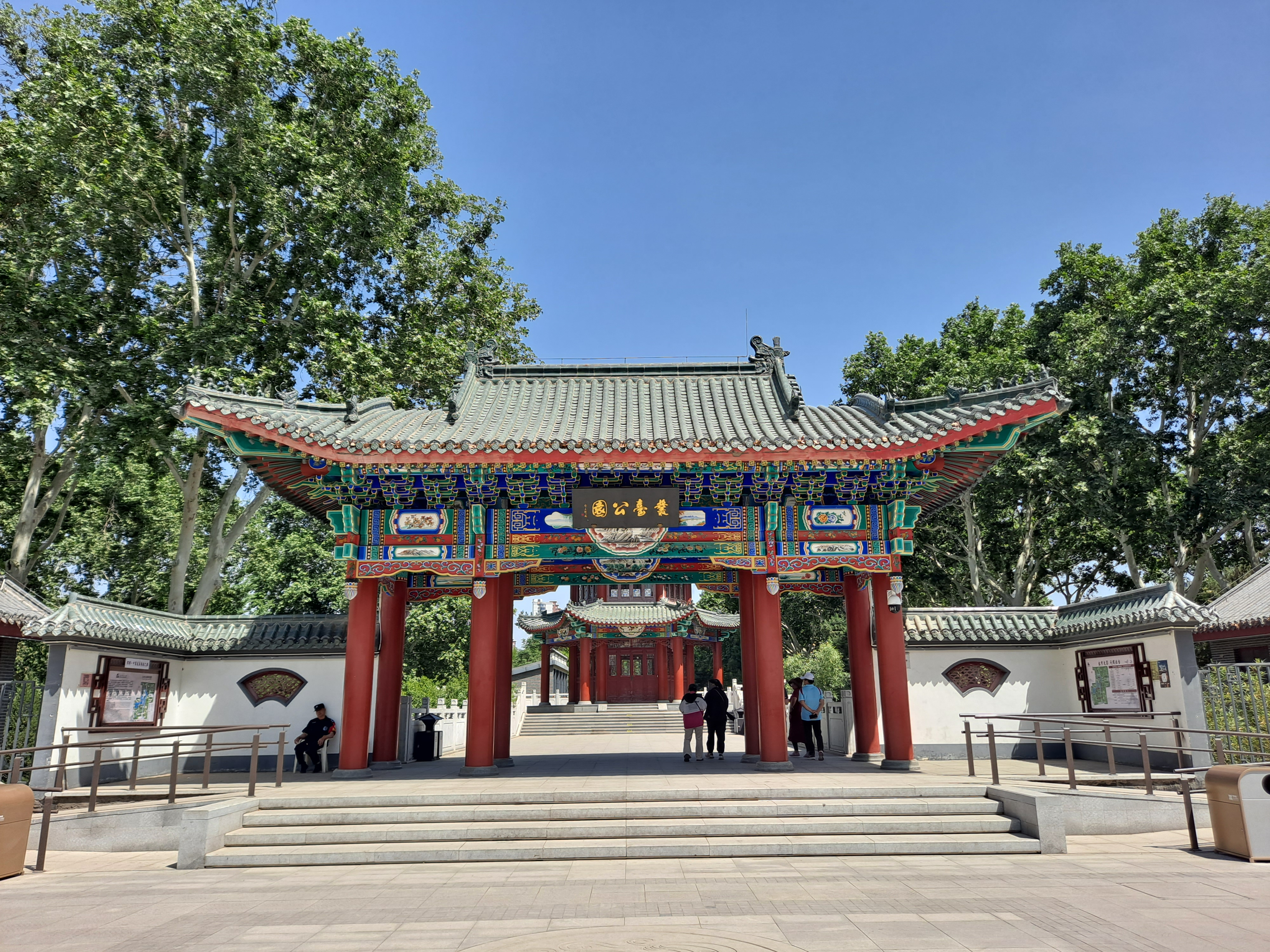
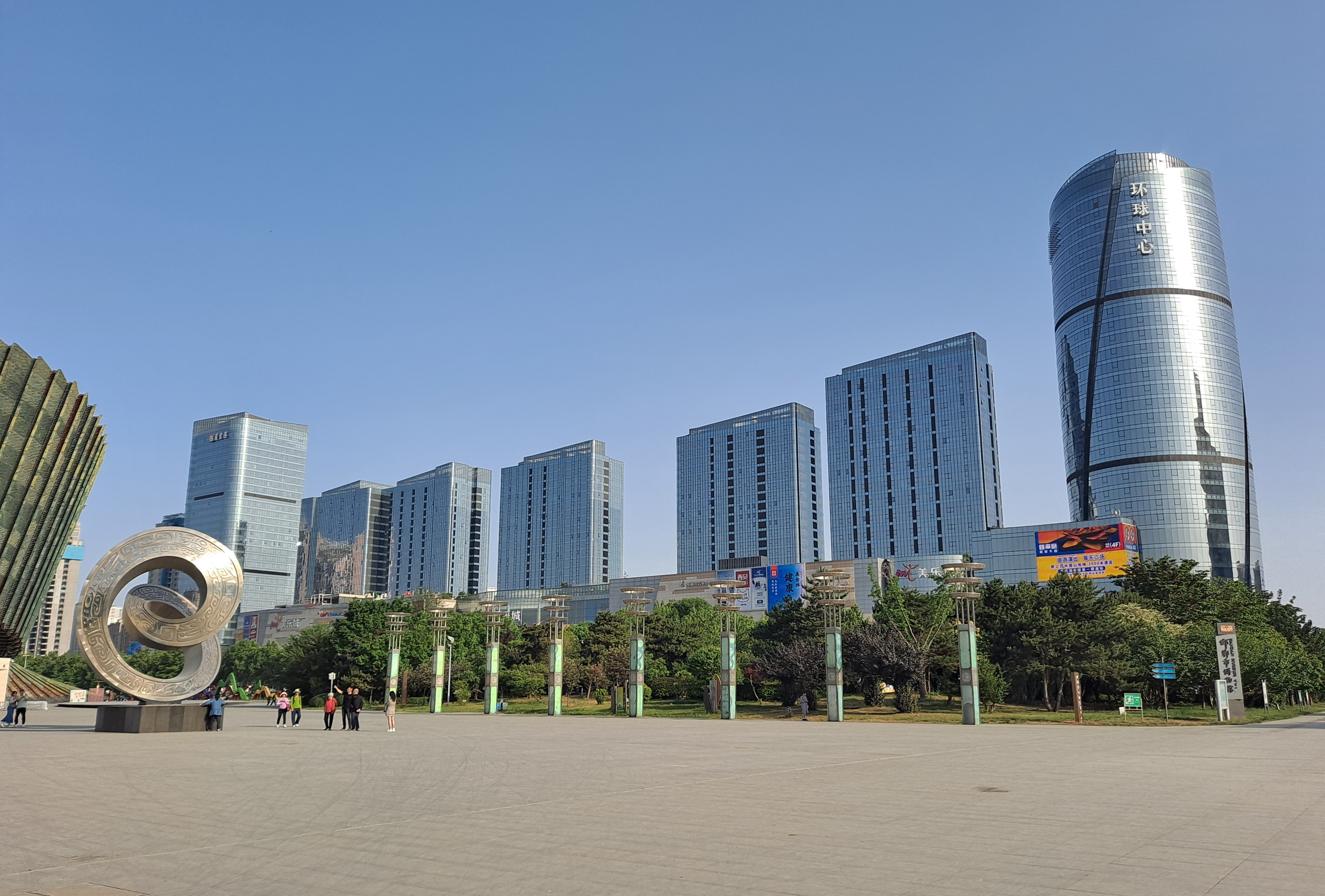
- Wuling Congtai (historical tower) Congtai Square (city center plaza) Congtai Park (landscape view) West Gate of Congtai Park Handan Meile City (shopping complex)

- Location in Hebei
- Coordinates (Congtai District government): 36°38′11″N 114°29′34″E
- Country: China
- Province: Hebei
- Prefecture-level city: Handan
- District seat: East Lianfang Subdistrict

Area
  - Total: 28 km^{2} (11 sq mi)
- Elevation: 61 m (200 ft)

Population (2020 census)
  - Total: 572,175
  - Density: 20,000/km^{2} (53,000/sq mi)
- Time zone: UTC+8 (China Standard)
- Postal code: 056004
- Website: www.hdct.gov.cn

Congtai District (simplified Chinese: 丛台区; traditional Chinese: 叢台區; pinyin: Cóngtái Qū) is a district of the city of Handan, Hebei, China, with a population of 330,000 residing in an area of just 28 km^{2} (11 sq mi).

The district seats the Handan's executive, legislature and judiciary, together with its Communist Party and Public Security bureaus.

== Administration ==
The district comprises 10 subdistricts, 1 town and 4 townships.

10 subdistricts

- West Congtai Subdistrict (丛台西街道)
- West Lianfang Subdistrict (联纺西街道)
- East Lianfang Subdistrict (联纺东街道)
- Guangmingqiao Subdistrict (光明桥街道)
- East Congtai Subdistrict (丛台东街道)
- Sijiqing Subdistrict (四季青街道)
- Heping Subdistrict (和平街道)
- Zhonghua Subdistrict (中华街道)
- Renmin Road Subdistrict (人民路街道)
- Liulinqiao Subdistrict (柳林桥街道)

1 town

- Huangliangmeng Town (黄粱梦镇)

4 township

- Sucao Township (苏曹乡)
- Sanling Township (三陵乡)
- Nanlügu Township (南吕固乡)
- Jianzhuang Township (兼庄乡)
