= Fengfengkuang, Handan =

Fengfengkuang District 峰峰矿区
- District
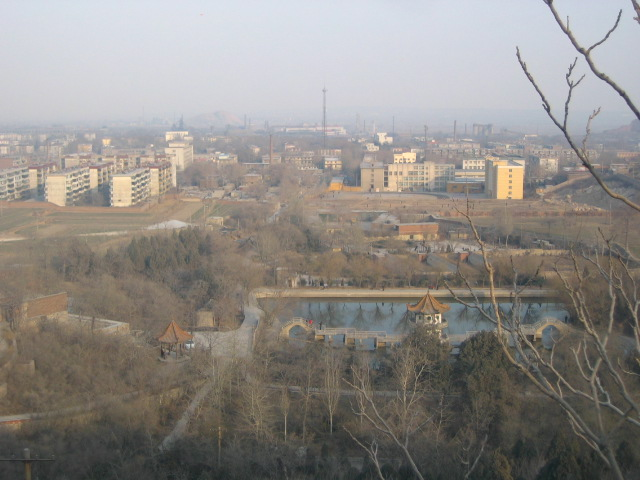

- Location in Hebei
- Coordinates: 36°25′11″N 114°12′46″E
- Country: People's Republic of China
- Province: Hebei
- Prefecture-level city: Handan
- Elevation: 131 m (430 ft)
- Time zone: UTC+8 (China Standard)

Fengfeng Mining District (simplified Chinese: 峰峰矿区; traditional Chinese: 峰峰礦區; pinyin: Fēngfēng Kuàngqū) is a district of the city of Handan, Hebei, People's Republic of China.

== Administrative Divisions ==
Towns:

- Linshui (临水镇), Fengfeng Town (峰峰镇), Xinpo (新坡镇), Dashe (大社镇), Hecun (和村镇), Yijing (义井镇), Pengcheng (彭城镇), Jiecheng (界城镇), Dayu (大峪镇)

== Climate ==
Climate data for Fengfeng, elevation 149 m (489 ft), (1991–2020 normals, extremes 1981–2010)
Month	Jan	Feb	Mar	Apr	May	Jun	Jul	Aug	Sep	Oct	Nov	Dec	Year
Record high °C (°F)	19.1 (66.4)	27.9 (82.2)	32.7 (90.9)	41.8 (107.2)	40.2 (104.4)	43.9 (111.0)	41.9 (107.4)	38.2 (100.8)	40.2 (104.4)	34.3 (93.7)	28.5 (83.3)	25.5 (77.9)	43.9 (111.0)
Mean daily maximum °C (°F)	4.6 (40.3)	8.9 (48.0)	15.4 (59.7)	22.2 (72.0)	27.9 (82.2)	32.3 (90.1)	32.2 (90.0)	30.5 (86.9)	27.0 (80.6)	21.4 (70.5)	13.2 (55.8)	6.5 (43.7)	20.2 (68.3)
Daily mean °C (°F)	−0.3 (31.5)	3.3 (37.9)	9.5 (49.1)	16.3 (61.3)	22.2 (72.0)	26.7 (80.1)	27.6 (81.7)	26.1 (79.0)	21.7 (71.1)	15.6 (60.1)	7.7 (45.9)	1.5 (34.7)	14.8 (58.7)
Mean daily minimum °C (°F)	−3.8 (25.2)	−0.7 (30.7)	4.8 (40.6)	11.1 (52.0)	16.9 (62.4)	21.4 (70.5)	23.6 (74.5)	22.5 (72.5)	17.7 (63.9)	11.4 (52.5)	3.9 (39.0)	−2.0 (28.4)	10.6 (51.0)
Record low °C (°F)	−14.0 (6.8)	−12.6 (9.3)	−5.3 (22.5)	0.5 (32.9)	7.5 (45.5)	11.4 (52.5)	16.2 (61.2)	13.6 (56.5)	6.3 (43.3)	0.3 (32.5)	−9.1 (15.6)	−12.7 (9.1)	−14.0 (6.8)
Average precipitation mm (inches)	3.4 (0.13)	7.7 (0.30)	9.4 (0.37)	33.6 (1.32)	38.7 (1.52)	51.0 (2.01)	154.0 (6.06)	117.9 (4.64)	49.7 (1.96)	28.3 (1.11)	15.6 (0.61)	3.7 (0.15)	513 (20.18)
Average precipitation days (≥ 0.1 mm)	2.1	2.9	2.9	5.4	6.8	8.3	11.9	10.3	7.7	5.6	4.1	2.1	70.1
Average snowy days	3.0	3.1	0.9	0.3	0	0	0	0	0	0	1.1	2.7	11.1
Average relative humidity (%)	57	54	50	53	54	56	72	75	69	62	62	59	60
Mean monthly sunshine hours	123.2	138.7	187.8	214.8	238.7	211.3	173.4	182.4	173.7	169.2	141.0	135.4	2,089.6
Percentage possible sunshine	40	45	50	54	55	48	39	44	47	49	46	45	47
Source: China Meteorological Administration
