= Handan =

City in Hebei province, China

Handan 邯郸市 Hantan
- Prefecture-level city
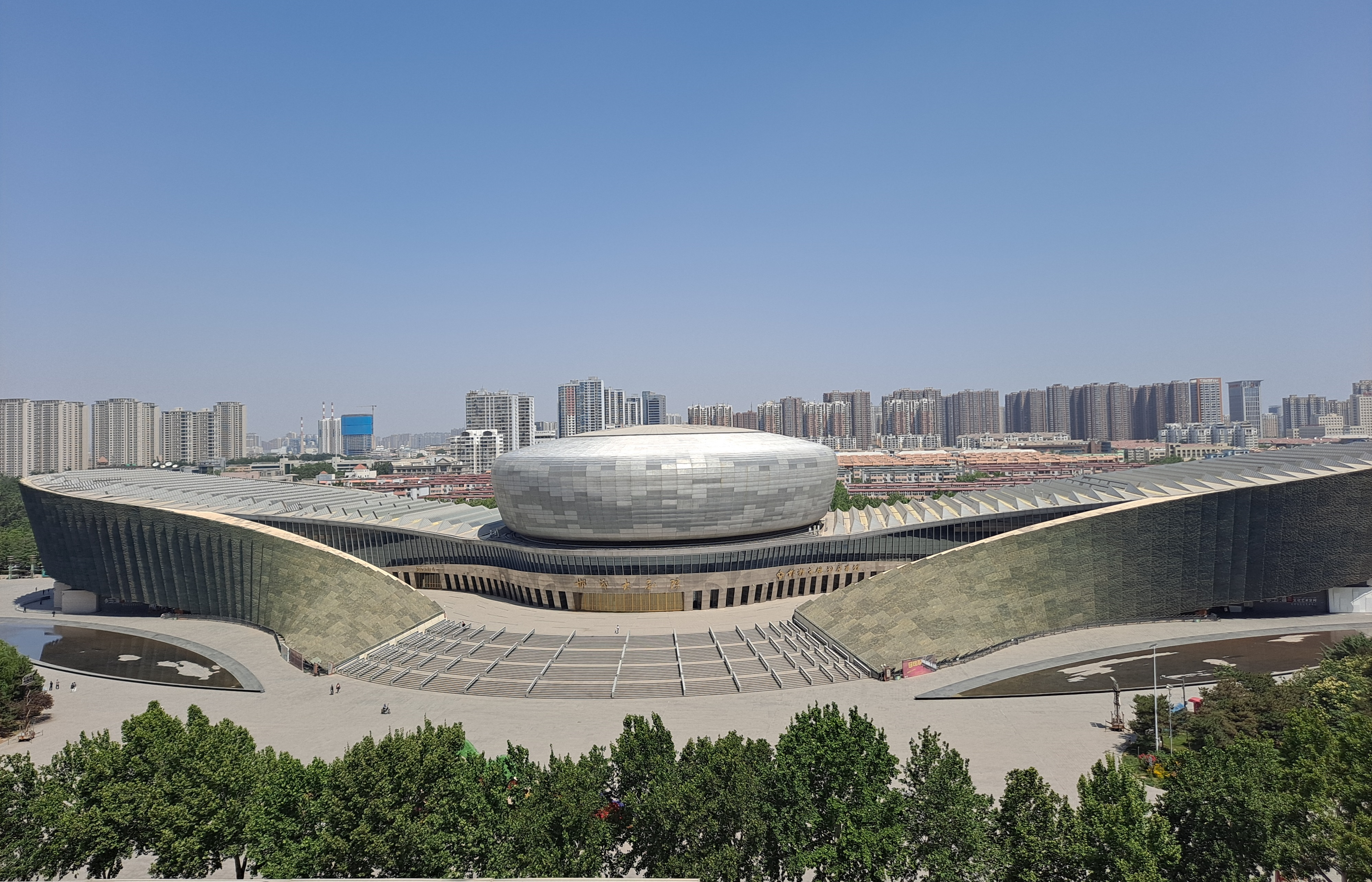
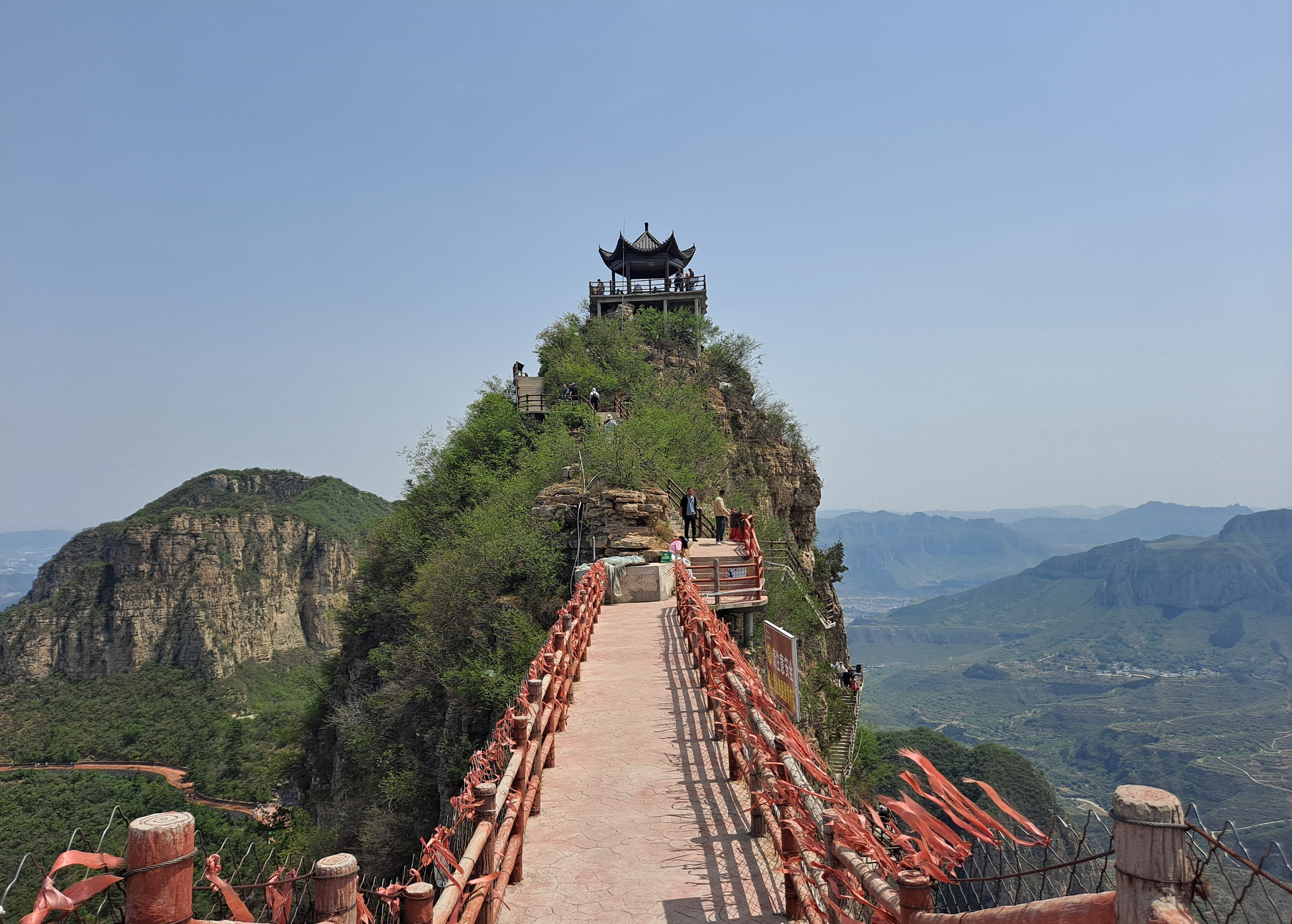
- Wuling Congtai Handandao Historic District Xiangtangshan Caves Handan Grand Theatre Downtown Handan Taihang Wuzhi Mountain Site of the Capital of Zhao
- Nickname: Dream City (梦城)
- Interactive map of Handan
- Location of the city center in Hebei Handan (Northern China) Handan (China)
- Coordinates (Shanxi–Hebei–Shandong–Henan Revolution Memorial Park / (晋冀鲁豫革命纪念园): 36°36′04″N 114°29′13″E
- Country: People's Republic of China
- Province: Hebei
- Settled: 6500 BC
- Established: November 15, 1983
- Municipal Seat: Congtai District

Area
  - Prefecture-level city: 12,068 km^{2} (4,659 sq mi)
  - Urban: 556.00 km^{2} (214.67 sq mi)
  - Districts: 2,649.1 km^{2} (1,022.8 sq mi)

Population (2020)
  - Prefecture-level city: 9,433,000
  - Density: 781.7/km^{2} (2,024/sq mi)
  - Urban: 2,845,790
  - Urban density: 5,100/km^{2} (13,000/sq mi)
  - Districts: 4,012,000

GDP
  - Prefecture-level city: CN¥ 315 billion US$ 50.5 billion
  - Per capita: CN¥ 33,450; US$5,371
- Time zone: UTC+8 (China Standard)
- ISO 3166 code: CN-HE-04
- Vehicle registration: 冀D
- Website: hd.gov.cn

Handan
- "Handan" in Simplified (top) and Traditional (bottom) Chinese characters
- Traditional Chinese: 邯鄲
- Simplified Chinese: 邯郸
- Postal: Hantan
- Literal meaning: "the city at the terminus of Mount Han"
Transcriptions
Standard Mandarin
- Hanyu Pinyin: Hándān
- Wade–Giles: Han^{2}-tan^{1}
- IPA: [xǎn.tán]
Yue: Cantonese
- Yale Romanization: Hòhn-dāan
- Jyutping: Hon^{4}-daan^{1}
- IPA: [hɔn˩.tan˥]
Southern Min
- Hokkien POJ: Hân-tan
Old Chinese
- Baxter–Sagart (2014): *[g]ˤa[n] tˤa[r]

Handan is a prefecture-level city located in the southwest of Hebei province, China. The southernmost prefecture-level city of the province, it borders Xingtai on the north, and the provinces of Shanxi on the west, Henan on the south and Shandong on the east. At the 2010 census, its population was 9,174,683 inhabitants of whom 2,845,790 lived in the built-up (or metro) area made of 5 urban districts. By the end of 2024, the total resident population of the city is 9,182,100, and the urbanization rate of the resident population is 62.10%. Yongnian District in Handan and Shahe City in Xingtai have largely formed into a single conurbation.

Handan is one of the oldest cities in China, first settled around 6500 BC by the Cishan culture. Throughout the city's long history, it contributed significantly to Chinese culture, serving as the capital of State of Zhao, was northern China's political, economic and cultural center, and home to Tai chi and the first compass, made from stones collected in the nearby Mount Ci (magnet mountain). Handan is designated as one of China's National Famous Historical and Cultural Cities.

== Etymology ==
The city's name, Handan (Chinese: 邯郸), has remained unchanged for over 3,000 years. The name first appeared during the reign of King Zhou of Shang, in the chronicle Bamboo Annals.

A dictionary from the Tang dynasty explained that "Han" (Chinese: 邯) is the name of a nearby mountain (Hanshan), and "Dan" (Chinese: 单) meant "the terminus of a mountain" with an added radical (Chinese: 阝) denoting a city. Together, "Handan" means "the city at the terminus of Mount Han". This explanation has been widely accepted until the discoveries of jade writings in Houma, Shanxi in 1965, where the "Dan" in Handan was spelt "丹", meaning red. This then lead to another explanation that Handan was named so because Mount Han appeared reddish-purple in color.

The different spellings of the city's name consolidated into the modern spelling in Qin dynasty.

== History ==
Map of the archaeological site of Warring States Era Handan

=== Ancient China ===
According to the Bamboo Annals, during the late Shang dynasty, the kings constructed palaces in the Handan area, with a time span of 3,050 to 3,100 years ago. In the early Western Zhou period, during the reign of King Cheng of Zhou, Handan was part of the Bei state and was inhabited by Wu Geng, the son of the last king of Shang. Later, it came under the control of the state of Wey. In 661 BCE, the Di people conquered Handan and ruled it for over 40 years after destroying Wey. In 588 BCE, the Jin state defeated the Di, and Handan was incorporated into Jin. In 546 BCE, after Wey's restoration, a rebellion forced members of the Wey royal family to flee to Handan for refuge. This event is recorded in The Spring and Autumn Annals (Guliang Commentary).

During the Warring States period (5th–3rd centuries BCE), Handan was an important city of the state of Zhao. In 386 BCE, Marquess Jing of Zhao officially relocated the capital to Handan and initiated large-scale construction. It was their second capital, after Zhongmu. It remained the capital for 158 years, until Zhao was conquered by the Qin. King Wuling of Zhao turned Zhao into one of the Qin state's most stalwart foes, pioneering the use of walls to secure new frontiers (which would inspire the eventual construction of the Great Wall of China). The city was conquered by the State of Qin after the virtual annexation of Zhao by Qin in 228 BCE, except for the Dai Commandery.

=== Imperial China ===
During the imperial period, the history of what is now Handan was not centered on one city alone. Political and economic weight shifted among Handan proper, Ye in present-day Linzhang County, Guangfu in Yongnian, Cizhou in the west, and Daming in the east.

According to Sima Qian's Records of the Grand Historian, the future Qin Shi Huang was born in Handan while his father, the future King Zhuangxiang of Qin, was living there as a Qin hostage in Zhao. After Qin conquered Zhao in 228 BCE, Handan became a commandery city; under the Han dynasty, it became the seat of a Zhao kingdom. Early in the Han, Liu Bang was at Handan during the campaign against Chen Xi's rebellion. By the late Western Han, Handan was remembered as one of the era's great metropolitan centres, with developed commerce, handicrafts, and iron working. Its decline is often associated with the conflict between Wang Lang and Liu Xiu: after Liu Xiu captured Handan, the city was reduced from a regional capital to a county seat.

After the Han, Ye gradually overshadowed Handan proper. Located in present-day Linzhang, Ye served at different times as a capital or major political centre for Cao Wei, Later Zhao, Ran Wei, Former Yan, Eastern Wei, and Northern Qi. Its northern and southern cities, central-axis planning, and famous terraces such as the Bronze Bird Terrace made it one of the important experiments in early Chinese capital design. In 580, after Yuchi Jiong rebelled against Yang Jian, Ye was destroyed, ending its long role as the region's leading city.

The Northern Qi period also left one of the area's most important artistic legacies at the Xiangtangshan Caves, near modern Fengfeng. The caves are a major Buddhist cave-temple complex of the sixth century, and many of their sculptures later entered museum collections outside China.

In the late Sui dynasty, the region again became politically important during the rebellions against Sui rule. Dou Jiande captured Mingzhou in 619 and made Guangfu, in present-day Yongnian, the capital of his short-lived Xia regime. Under the Tang dynasty, Handan proper was a county town subordinate to Mingzhou and later Cizhou, while other towns in the modern prefecture carried more regional weight.

The An Lushan rebellion again drew attention to Ye: An Qingxu held the city before Shi Siming entered Ye and killed him in 759. After the rebellion, the eastern part of present-day Handan became central to the history of Weibo, a powerful semi-autonomous military command based at Wei Prefecture, in the area of modern Daming. Weibo, later known as Tianxiong Circuit, shaped northern Chinese politics from the late Tang into the Five Dynasties and Ten Kingdoms period. The shift from Ye to Weizhou, and later from Weibo to Daming, marked a broader change from a capital-centred military landscape to a Song-period commercial and strategic city system. In 923, Li Cunxu proclaimed himself emperor at Wei Prefecture, founding the Later Tang.

Daming reached another high point under the Northern Song. In 1042, Emperor Renzong of Song elevated Daming Prefecture to the status of Beijing, a companion capital intended to strengthen the dynasty's northern defence system against the Liao dynasty. During the Song, Jin, and Yuan periods, the region was also known for Cizhou ware, produced around Ci County and Pengcheng in modern Fengfeng. Cizhou kilns became famous for sturdy northern stonewares, especially white-slipped vessels with black or brown painted decoration.

Under the Yuan dynasty, the region remained administratively important even though it no longer held the capital-like status that Ye or Song-period Daming had once enjoyed. Daming continued as Daming Road (Chinese: 大名路; pinyin: Dàmíng Lù), a Yuan administrative circuit directly under the Central Secretariat. Farther west, Mingzhou was reorganized as Guangping Road (Chinese: 广平路; pinyin: Guǎngpíng Lù), with its seat still at Guangfu; local accounts describe the Yuan official Wang Wei as enlarging Guangfu's walls and building four gates. The Yuan period also helps explain the later urban geography of the area: towns such as Guangfu and Daming benefited from rivers and canals, but they also lived with the danger of flooding. In 1401, early in the Ming dynasty, the Zhang and Wei rivers flooded old Daming, destroying the city and sealing much of the Song-Yuan urban site under silt.

In the Ming dynasty, Daming Road became Daming Prefecture, while Guangping Road became Guangping Prefecture. Handan County itself was under Guangping Prefecture, and Guangfu served as a prefectural seat through the Ming and Qing periods. The new Ming city of Daming was built near the flooded old city, while Guangfu's walls and water defenses helped it remain a durable administrative town. Under the Qing dynasty, the administrative pattern of Guangping and Daming prefectures largely continued. River transport on the Fuyang River helped revive trade in the region, linking Handan with downstream markets toward Tianjin; small cargo boats still used the route into the twentieth century. Daming also briefly had supra-regional importance in early Qing administration: the Zhili-Shandong-Henan governor-general was stationed there in 1666, before Baoding became the capital of Zhili in 1669.

=== Modern China ===
Handan's modern history was shaped by a shift from river trade to rail transport, wartime institutions, heavy industry, and heritage tourism. Before the railway age, the Fuyang River still linked the area with markets downstream toward Tianjin, carrying coal, ceramics, and other local goods; small cargo boats continued to use the route into the mid-twentieth century. The opening of the Jinghan railway and Handan railway station in 1906 gave the old county town a new position on a national north-south route, helping it re-emerge as a centre of southern Hebei.

During the Second Sino-Japanese War, the mountainous western part of present-day Handan became an important Communist base area. The headquarters of the Eighth Route Army's 129th Division was located at Chi'an village in She County from 1940 to 1945, where Liu Bocheng and Deng Xiaoping directed operations in the Taihang region. After Japan's surrender in 1945, Handan was established as a city for the first time.

The city soon became a battlefield in the renewed Chinese Civil War. The Handan Campaign, also known as the Pinghan Campaign, was fought from 24 October to 2 November 1945, when forces of the Jin-Ji-Lu-Yu Military Region opposed Nationalist troops moving north along the Pinghan railway.

Handan and its surrounding counties also became wartime media centres. On 15 May 1946, the Jin-Ji-Lu-Yu People's Daily held its founding ceremony in Handan; the paper's office moved from Handan to Wu'an in late June 1946. In She County, Handan Xinhua Radio began broadcasting in 1946; in 1947, after the Communist evacuation from northern Shaanxi, facilities there were used to continue Xinhua radio broadcasts.

After the founding of the People's Republic of China, Handan was restored as a city in 1952 and became a province-administered city in 1954; Fengfeng was merged into Handan in 1956. Its post-1949 growth depended on rail connections and nearby coal and iron resources, especially the coalfields of Fengfeng and industrial links with Wu'an. Handan developed iron and steel, textiles, petrochemicals, machinery, and other industries, while the surrounding area remained known for ceramics.

Modern Handan's public identity has continued to draw on its older history. The city is closely associated with Chinese idioms and allusions; scholars have attributed more than 1,500 idioms to Handan, including "learning to walk in Handan" (Chinese: 邯郸学步; pinyin: Hándān xué bù). In Yongnian, Guangfu is promoted as a centre of tai chi culture; Yang-style tai chi is listed as a national intangible cultural heritage item and is associated with Yang Luchan of Guangfu.

The modern history of Handan's antiquities has also had an international dimension. Sculptures from the Xiangtangshan Caves were removed in the first half of the twentieth century and entered the international art market; since 2003, researchers have used 3-D imaging to match displaced fragments to their original locations and digitally reconstruct parts of the caves.

In 2007, Handan drew national attention for the Agricultural Bank of China robbery, an inside theft involving 50.95 million yuan that Xinhua described as China's largest-ever bank theft.

== Administration ==
The population at the 2010 census was 941,427 for the 3 urban districts, 2,845,790 for the built up area and 9,174,683 for the entire Prefecture-level city area of 12,068 km^{2} (4,659 sq mi).

The municipal executive, legislative and judiciary are situated in Congtai District (丛台区, Cóngtái Qū), as well as the CPC and Public Security bureaux.

Map
Name	Chinese	Pinyin	Population (2004 est.)	Area (km^{2})	Density (/km^{2})
Congtai District	丛台区	Cóngtái Qū	330,000	28	11,786
Hanshan District	邯山区	Hánshān Qū	310,000	32	9,688
Fuxing District	复兴区	Fùxīng Qū	250,000	37	6,757
Fengfeng Mining District	峰峰矿区	Fēngfēng Kuàngqū	500,000	353	1,416
Feixiang District	肥乡区	Féixiāng Qū	310,000	496	625
Yongnian District	永年区	Yǒngnián Qū	860,000	898	958
Wu'an City	武安市	Wǔ'ān Shì	720,000	1,806	399
~~Handan County~~ (Defunct since 2016)	邯郸县	Hándān Xiàn	400,000	522	766
Linzhang County	临漳县	Línzhāng Xiàn	590,000	744	793
Cheng'an County	成安县	Chéng'ān Xiàn	370,000	485	763
Daming County	大名县	Dàmíng Xiàn	750,000	1,052	713
She County	涉县	Shè Xiàn	390,000	1,509	258
Ci County	磁县	Cí Xiàn	640,000	1,035	618
Qiu County	邱县	Qiū Xiàn	200,000	448	446
Jize County	鸡泽县	Jīzé Xiàn	250,000	337	742
Guangping County	广平县	Guǎngpíng Xiàn	250,000	320	781
Guantao County	馆陶县	Guǎntáo Xiàn	290,000	456	636
Wei County	魏县	Wèi Xiàn	810,000	862	940
Quzhou County	曲周县	Qǔzhōu Xiàn	410,000	667	615

== Climate ==
Handan has a monsoon-influenced humid continental climate/semi-arid climate (Köppen Dwa/BSk), with strong monsoonal influence, typical of the North China Plain. The normal monthly daily mean temperature ranges from −0.9 °C (30.4 °F) in January to 27.3 °C (81.1 °F) in July, while the annual mean temperature is 14.3 °C (57.7 °F). A majority of the normal annual precipitation of 502 mm (19.8 in) occurs in July and August.

Climate data for Handan, elevation 67 m (220 ft), (1991–2020 normals, extremes 1981–2010)
Month	Jan	Feb	Mar	Apr	May	Jun	Jul	Aug	Sep	Oct	Nov	Dec	Year
Record high °C (°F)	19.7 (67.5)	25.3 (77.5)	31.7 (89.1)	37.9 (100.2)	40.0 (104.0)	43.6 (110.5)	42.0 (107.6)	37.2 (99.0)	40.1 (104.2)	33.5 (92.3)	28.6 (83.5)	28.4 (83.1)	43.6 (110.5)
Mean daily maximum °C (°F)	4.2 (39.6)	8.7 (47.7)	15.3 (59.5)	22.1 (71.8)	27.7 (81.9)	32.5 (90.5)	32.5 (90.5)	30.8 (87.4)	27.3 (81.1)	21.4 (70.5)	12.8 (55.0)	6.0 (42.8)	20.1 (68.2)
Daily mean °C (°F)	−0.7 (30.7)	3.1 (37.6)	9.5 (49.1)	16.1 (61.0)	22.0 (71.6)	26.6 (79.9)	27.8 (82.0)	26.2 (79.2)	21.8 (71.2)	15.5 (59.9)	7.3 (45.1)	1.1 (34.0)	14.7 (58.4)
Mean daily minimum °C (°F)	−4.5 (23.9)	−1.3 (29.7)	4.3 (39.7)	10.5 (50.9)	16.2 (61.2)	21.1 (70.0)	23.6 (74.5)	22.4 (72.3)	17.3 (63.1)	10.7 (51.3)	3.0 (37.4)	−2.8 (27.0)	10.0 (50.1)
Record low °C (°F)	−15.0 (5.0)	−14.4 (6.1)	−6.1 (21.0)	0.0 (32.0)	7.7 (45.9)	11.5 (52.7)	16.5 (61.7)	13.7 (56.7)	5.4 (41.7)	−1.0 (30.2)	−11.4 (11.5)	−12.7 (9.1)	−15.0 (5.0)
Average precipitation mm (inches)	3.2 (0.13)	7.6 (0.30)	9.8 (0.39)	27.1 (1.07)	40.8 (1.61)	50.7 (2.00)	147.0 (5.79)	122.7 (4.83)	46.5 (1.83)	26.3 (1.04)	14.9 (0.59)	3.5 (0.14)	500.1 (19.72)
Average precipitation days (≥ 0.1 mm)	2.4	3.1	2.8	5.2	6.5	8.2	10.8	9.6	7.0	5.4	3.8	2.3	67.1
Average snowy days	3.7	3.0	1.1	0.2	0	0	0	0	0	0	1.3	2.7	12
Average relative humidity (%)	57	53	50	54	56	56	72	76	69	64	64	60	61
Mean monthly sunshine hours	133.1	149.2	198.5	222.3	252.7	228.4	192.1	193.7	179.5	177.0	144.3	138.0	2,208.8
Percentage possible sunshine	43	48	53	56	58	52	43	47	49	51	48	46	50
Source: China Meteorological Administration

== Economy ==
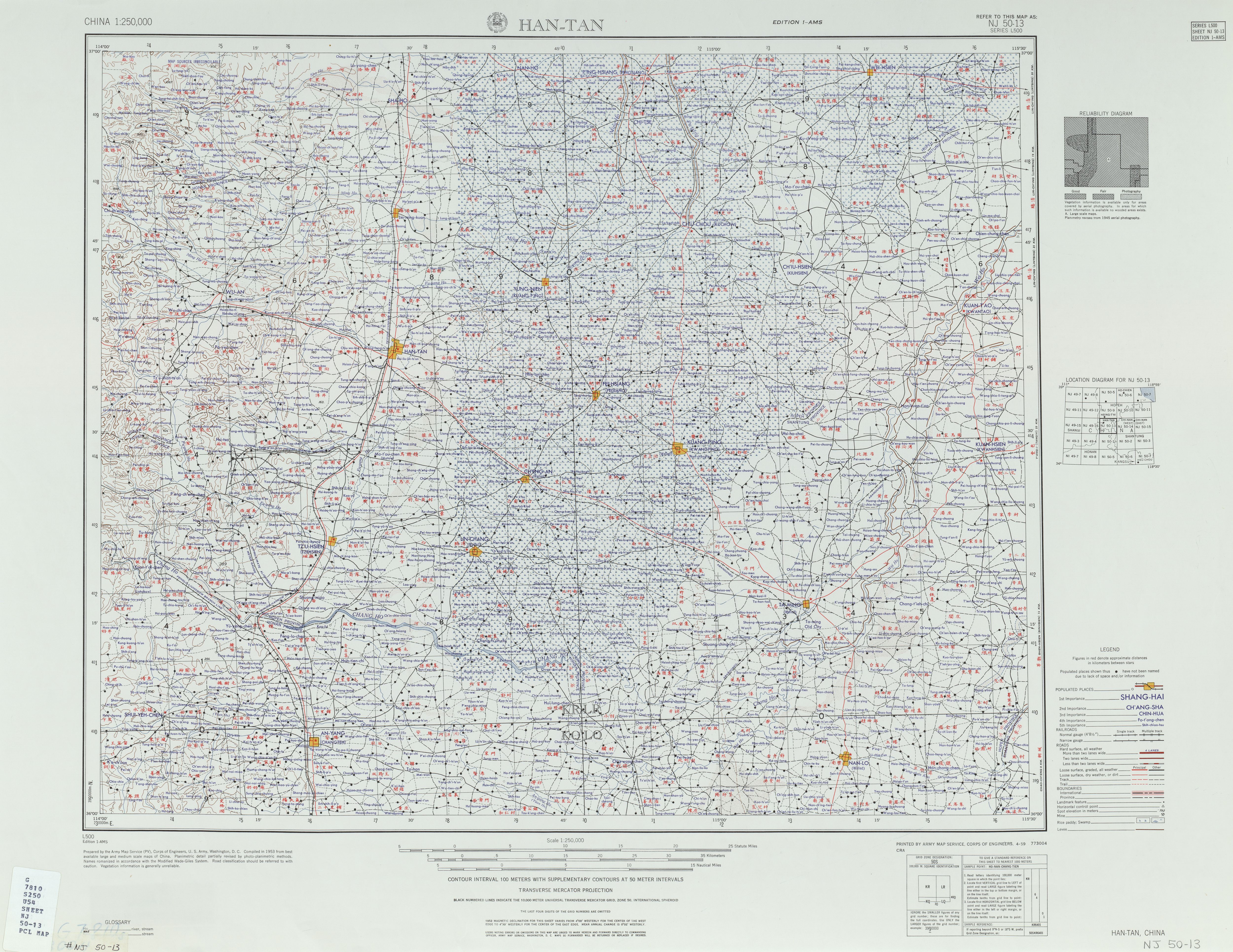
Map including Handan (labeled as HAN-TAN 邯鄲) (AMS, 1953)

Handan has witnessed rapid growth over the past 20 years. Industrial growth in the city has focused on communication and transport activities. Handan is a major producer of coal and steel, with Coal mines at Fengfeng providing power for Handan's iron, steel and textile mills. Chemical and cement plants along with other industries also benefit. Local agriculture produces maize, pomegranates and eggs. Handan also has a growing services sector, with retail, banking and trading making up 40% of the economy. The GDP per capita in Renminbi was estimated at ¥13,449 in 2005. In 2015, the figure was ¥33,554.87.

=== Air pollution ===
According to a survey by "Global voices China" in February 2013, Handan was one of China's most polluted cities due to heavy industrial outputs.

However the government has made a significant effort to make the city cleaner, which involved closing down many polluting power plants. It is no longer the most polluted city, and, according to a 2016 government survey, the number of good air quality days is 189 days, an increase of 135 days compared with 2013.

=== Tourism ===
Handan Prefecture is home to the AAAAA tourist attractions Guangfu Ancient City and the Nüwa Imperial Palace. Handan Prefecture is also home to the Xiangtangshan Caves.

=== Transportation ===
Handan is served by Handan Airport. Handan has two main train stations: one is Handan railway station which serves for the normal speed train, the other is named Handandong railway station, which serves for the high speed train.

== Demographics ==
=== Ethnic minorities ===
According to Handan government in 2007, 40 ethnic groups were present in Handan. Ethnic minorities represent 50,000 people, among which 48,000 Hui. There are 22 Hui schools and 5 Hui junior high schools in Handan.

=== Religion ===
The most widespread religion in Handan is Chinese folk religion, including Taoism and Buddhism.

In 2013, there were more than 150,000 Catholics in Handan according to the Catholic Church, in the Roman Catholic Diocese of Yongnian. Mother of Grace Cathedral in Daming County was built in 1918. The most recent church was built in 2007.

There are also 300,000 Protestants. The largest Protestant church is on Qianjin Avenue (邯郸市西堂) and was built in 1997. The oldest church was on Congtai Street and was built in 1920. The church was destroyed in 2009 by the local government. A new church was built in 2011.

According to the local government 30,000 Hui Muslims live in the prefecture of Handan.

== Culture ==
=== Idioms ===
Handan is hailed as the capital of Chinese idioms. As a prosperous city and cultural center during the Warring States period, Handan attracted many scholars. Over 1,500 idioms and proverbs are attributed to the city. The following are some of the most well known idioms.

- 邯鄲學步 (literally: "to study the walking method of Handan"), meaning to badly imitate others, and lose one's individuality in the process.
- 黃粱一夢 (literally: "millet dream"), meaning a pipe dream.
- 頂天立地 (literally: "stand upright on one's two legs between heaven and earth"), meaning to be fiercely independent.
- 圍魏救趙 (literally: "to besiege the State of Wei to rescue the State of Zhao"), meaning to relieve a besieged ally by attacking the besiegers.
- 不可同日而語 (literally: "musn't speak of the two things on the same day"), meaning incomparable.
- 驚弓之鳥 (literally: "a bird frightened by the mere sound of shooting arrows"), a panic-stricken person.
- 鷸蚌相爭，漁翁得利 (literally: "when the snipe and the oyster fight, it is the fisherman that wins"), when two parties fight, it is always the third one who wins. King of Yan sent a representative to King Hui of Zhao to relay this message in order for him to rethink his plans of war.
- 曠日持久 (literally: "drawn out and protracted"), meaning to be protracted.
- 完璧歸趙 (literally: "returning the Jade to Zhao"), meaning to return something to its owner in good condition.
- 价值连城 (literally: "to be worth numerous contiguous cities"), meaning priceless.
- 怒髮衝冠 (literally: "one's hair raised to the hat in anger"), meaning to be furious.
- 負荊請罪 (literally: "carrying thorned grass and pleading guilt"), meaning to offer someone a humble apology.
- 紙上談兵 (literally: "to discuss military tactics on paper"), meaning to be an armchair strategist.
- 青出於藍，而勝於藍 (literally: "green is born of blue, but beats blue"), meaning to outmaster the teacher.

=== Notable people ===
- Lian Po, a military general of Zhao. Regarded one of the four greatest generals of the Warring States period.
- Lin Xiangru, politician of the Warring States period. He's featured in two idioms, "Returning the Jade to Zhao" and "Carrying Thorned Grass and Pleading Guilt".
- Xun Kuang, Confucianism philosopher.
- Xu Huaizhong, novelist.
- Qin Shi Huang, founder of the Qin dynasty and was the first Emperor of China.
- Cao Cao, Han chancellor, poet, and warlord. One of the central figures of the Three Kingdoms period.
- Huang Hua, senior Communist Chinese revolutionary. The county-level city of Huanghua, Cangzhou, was named after him.
- Feng Jianming, literature scholar.
- Fang Lijun, an artist based in Beijing.
- Yang Luchan, martial arts teacher.
- Sun Qingmei, football player.
- Zhao Shi, football player.
- Zhang Weili, mixed martial artist, ring name "Magnum". She is the first ever Chinese and East Asian champion in UFC history.
- Chang Yongxiang, wrestler.

== Sister cities ==
- Kryvyi Rih, Dnipropetrovsk, Ukraine
- Padua, Veneto, Italy (1988)
- Saiki, Ōita, Japan (1994)
- Dubuque, Iowa, United States (1995)
- Miryang, South Gyeongsang, South Korea (2004)
- Ust-Ilimsk, Irkutsk Oblast, Russia
- Inari, Finland
